= Eudoxius (doctor) =

Eudoxius was a 5th century Bagaudae leader. The Gallic Chronicle of 452 mentions him as the leader of the uprising of the Bagaudae (rebellious farmers, slaves and deserters) in Armorica (present-day Brittany and the Loire Valley), after they had previously rebelled under Tibatto between 435 and 437. The new uprising was fought in 441 by the Alans on behalf of the Roman general Flavius Aetius.

== History ==
The uprisings show that the Bagaudae acted like an independent power; there are indications that they were minting their own coins to underline their rejection of imperial authority. Their movement arose due to the instability of the Roman authorities and the high tax burden in the crumbling Western Roman Empire. Due to the disappearance of Roman authority, they took the administration into their own hands.

Little is known with certainty about Eudoxius. The Gallic chronicle only mentions him as the leader of the uprising who was forced to take protection with the Huns after his defeat. This last fact can be explained, because Aetius no longer received support from the Huns around that time. The settlement of the Alans in the rebellious area fits into that context. Further is known that Eudoxius his profession was doctor. In the late Roman period, doctors were developed officials who were often among the urban elites or aristocratic households.

== Sources ==
- Gallic Chronicle of 452
- Constantius of Lyon, Vita Sancti Germani
- Salvianus, The Gubernatione Dei

== Bibliography ==
- Bachrach, B. S. (1967). Alans in Gaul. Cambridge University Press.
- Thompson, E. A. (1984). Saint Germanus of Auxerre and the end of Roman Britain. Woodbridge, Suffolk: Boydell Press.
- Thompson, E.A. (1982), Romans and Barbarians: The Decline of the Western Empire
- Lambert, David (2013), Salvian and the Bagaudae, in Gallien in Spätantike und Frühmittelalter (pp. 255-276), DOI:10.1515/9783110260779.255
