= Amand =

Amand may refer to:

== People ==
=== Given name ===
- Amand Vanderhagen (1753–1822), Flemish clarinetist and teacher
- Amand Bazard (1791–1832), French socialist
- Amand Landry (1805–1877), Acadian farmer and political figure in New Brunswick
- Amand Goegg (1820–1897), journalist and a democrat
- Jean-Amand Lamaze (1833–1906), French clergyman and bishop for the Roman Catholic Diocese of Tonga
- Pierre-Amand Landry (1846–1916), Acadian lawyer, judge, and political figure in New Brunswick
- Paul Amand Guignebault (1871–1931), French painter
- Amand Solbach (1904–1967), French gymnast
- Amand Audaire (1924–2013), French professional racing cyclist
- Amand Lucas (born 1936), Belgian scientist and professor
- Amand Dalem (1938–2018), Belgian politician who was Mayor of Rochefort
- Amand Theis (born 1949), German retired professional footballer

=== Surname ===
- Jacques-François Amand (1730–1769) was a French painter of historical subjects
- Henri Amand (1873–1967), French rugby union player
- Marcus Amand (born 2006), Finnish-born French racing driver
- Marc Amand Élisée Scherb (1747–1838), brigadier general in the French Revolutionary Wars

== Places ==
- Amand, Iran (disambiguation), several places in Iran
- Stade Michel-Amand, a stadium in Poitiers, France

== See also ==
- Armand (disambiguation)
- Amandus (disambiguation)
- Saint-Amand (disambiguation)
