= Burgundian Revolt of Gunther =

Burgundian revolt of Gundohar
- Part of the Fall of the Roman Empire and Roman–Germanic Wars
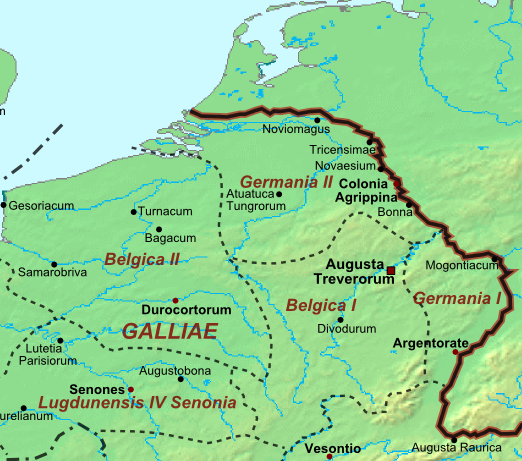
Date	435–436
Location	Germania Prima
Result	Roman victory

Belligerents
Western Roman Empire	Burgundians

Commanders and leaders
Flavius Aetius	Gunther

The Burgundian Revolt of Gunther was a revolt of the Burgundian foederati in the Western Roman Empire during the reign of Emperor Valentinian III. The uprising took place in the Gallic province of Germania Prima and was led by the King of the Burgundian Gunther, his main opponent was General Aetius.

In military terms there were two uprisings. The first rebellion was suppressed by Aëtius after its outbreak in 435, but flared up again the following year and was then ended with the death of Gundohar and the bloody suppression of the rebellion. The events associated with these insurrections became the subject of a medieval hero legend that was later integrated into the epic Nibelungenlied, the source of inspiration for Richard Wagner's opera cycle Der Ring des Nibelungen.

The history of this war is briefly narrated, the main sources are Prosper of Aquitaine (390-455) a Christian Roman writer and Hydatius (400-469), Bishop of Chaves. Others useful contemporary are Sidonius Apollinaris (430-486) and the unnamed Gallic chronicle of 452. The reasons for the uprisings have never been reported and the answer to this are given by later historians.

== Historical context ==
The Burgundian had established themselves within the Roman Empire after the Rhine crossing and supported the usurpation of Jovinus in 411. In return, as foederati they obtained their own settlement area along the Rhine between Mogontiacum and Argentoratum, which was later confirmed by Emperor Honorius in 413. They were in charge of defending the Limes from the Alps to Metz, after a large part of the border soldiers were withdrawn from the Rhine border. Under Gunther, the Burgundian had a great deal of autonomy, with the city of Worms acting as the capital.

=== Cause ===
Gunther is later suspected to have played a more dominant role in East-Galia. As a result, Aetius considered him a dangerous opponent. In 435, Gunther launched an attack on the adjacent province of Belgica Prima from the Burgundian area. In contemporary sources, no clear reason for this act of war is mentioned. The basis must therefore be sought in the political situation of the Roman Empire at that time. Aetius, after the civil war between him and Boniface ended in his favor, had become the most powerful person in the Western Empire, and the Vandal invasion of Africa had recently ended in 435 with a peace treaty. Despite this, the Western Empire was threatened by new developments. In the Gallic provinces, new powers were set up as the kings of the Visigothic and Burgundian foederati, while in Armorica a revolt broke out by Bacaudae.

Given the fact that the war in Africa had ended with a peace very favorable to the Vandals, there is a certain consensus among historians that the reason for Gunther's revolt should be sought in this. In all opinion, the Burgundians wanted to negotiate their treaty with the Romans by force. In addition, according to H.H. Anton has another reason behind the uprising. In his view, the Burgundians came under increasing pressure from the Huns and Gunther invaded the nearby area in response.

=== Multiple uprisings ===
The uprising of 435 was suppressed and the next year the Burgundy were revolting again. Like the first rebellion, the contemporary sources do not explain for this. Nevertheless, in view of the context, it is possible, although impossible to prove that the reason for the renewal of the war was the Burgundian dissatisfaction with the peace treaty of 435. Since Gunther Aetius for peace 'begged', it is almost certain that the renewed treaty of 435 disadvantageous for Gunther, and thus remained a source for dissatisfaction. Prospers' report shows that there was a second war:

“At the same time, Aetius crushed Gunther, who was king of Burgundy and lived in Gaul. In response to his request, Aetius gave him peace that the king did not enjoy long, for the Huns destroyed him and his people with root and branch. 436.”Prosper, Epitoma Chronicon, s.a. 436.

Situation in Gaul during the period 435-439

After the precipitation of the first Burgundian uprising, the difficulties for the Romans accumulated. While the campaign continued against the Bagaudae, the Burgundy in 436 revolted again, possibly encouraged by the Visigoths who also revolted that same year. Moreover, there also appears to be an uprising in Gallaecia of the Suebi.

=== The uprising ===
About the first uprising, the chronicles report that under the leadership of Gunther the Burgundian invaded the adjacent province and occupied the area around the city of Trier. In order to resist the threat of the Burgundian and Bagaudae, Aetius resorted to a two-pronged offensive. He sent his general Litorius with a large detachment of Hun cavalry to the uprising in Armorica, while he himself marched against the Burgundian. We don't know the great of these armies, but they must have been very big before that time. Aetius was able to appeal to large numbers of Hunse mercenaries, while it is possible that the strength of his army was further strengthened with Frankish foederati allegedly attacked from the north.

Aetius, who was accompanied by the future emperor Avitus, ended the rebellion. Nevertheless, it is unknown whether there was actually fighting. The military approach of the Roman army was usually aimed at avoiding direct confrontation. Usually it first tried to impress the opponent or overwhelm him by an ambush, after which negotiations followed. Be that as it may, the Burgundian were forced to sign a humiliating peace treaty. The peace that Aetius forced the Burgundians turned out to be short-lived because the Burgundians revolted again almost immediately after the departure of the Roman troops.

=== Battle of Worms ===
While Litorius was still in full swing to suppress the Bacaudian uprising in Armorica, the Burgundian and Goths rebelled in 436. That was no coincidence, it seems that Aëtius the Goths, who threatened Narbonne and the surrounding area in the south, first let go about their course. Given the fragile peace he had achieved in his vast empire, he was unwilling to head the Goths with army units from other areas which he would thereby leave undefended. Instead, he sent a delegation to the court of the Hun King Rua, asking him to make a military force available to him. When this army arrived, he decided with all available forces to quell the Burgundian uprising once and for all.

Aetius moved north with the combined armies and enclosed the army of Gunther. Near Worms, the Burgunders were attacked and a bloody battle took place. King Gunther died and a large part of his people and his entire family were murdered. Hydatius mentions in his chronicle that 20,000 Burgundian were slaughtered.

After this conflict, the Roman commander-in-chief Aetius established the Burgundian in the military district of Sapaudia in the vicinity of Lake Geneva in present-day Western Switzerland and Savoy around 443. Although the rebellion was bloodied by Aetius, the Burgundian people had not disappeared after that. Her military power, on the other hand, may have decreased in meaning, the people were still numerous. However, for securing Roman power in Northern Galicia, the Defence of the Roman limes was essential. The river border on the Rhine had to be defended, and the presence of the Burgundian on both banks posed a constant threat in Aetius' view. According to Mazzarino, Aetius therefore chose to move this people to an area where they could exert more influence than the difficult to control area like the Limes.

== Aftermath ==
Although this historically elusive Burgundian empire was an early victim of an attack by the Huns, it was not completely forgotten. In addition to the Roman written sources, there was also a Germanic oral tradition telling the demise of the kingdom in Worms. Heroes' songs, such as the Völsunga saga and the Nibelungenlied, which were only recorded in the early 13th century. Halfway through the 19th century, his demise was sung in Wagner's opera.

In Sapaudia, the Burgundian were given a new settlement area. To manage this, Aetius negotiated with the new leader of the Burgundian Gundioc. According to this new treaty, they once again lived as Roman foederati within the Roman Empire. As a military task they served to strengthen the garrisons in the Alps that secured the Alpine passes there against the northern Alamannes and were quickly available as auxiliary troops against attacks by the Huns.

== Bibliography ==
- Mazzarino, Santo (1976), The End of the Ancient World, Greenwood Press.
- Anton, Hans H. (1999), "Gundahar" in Beck, Heinrich; Geuenich, Dieter; Steuer, Heiko (eds.), Reallexikon der Germanischen Altertumskunde. Vol. 13. New York/Berlin: de Gruyter
- Ilkka Syvänne (2020), Military History of Late Rome 425–457, Pen & Sword Books Ltd
- Giulio Lucci (2015-2016), La romanizzazione e la cristianizzazione del popolo burgundo fra i secoli IV e V, ALMA MATER STUDIORUM - UNIVERSITA' DI BOLOGNA
- Hughes, Ian (2020), Aetius: Attila’s Nemesis, PEN & SWORD MILITARY
