= 417 =

417 in various calendars
- Gregorian calendar: 417; CDXVII
- Ab urbe condita: 1170
- Assyrian calendar: 5167
- Balinese saka calendar: 338–339
- Bengali calendar: −177 – −176
- Berber calendar: 1367
- Buddhist calendar: 961
- Burmese calendar: −221
- Byzantine calendar: 5925–5926
- Chinese calendar: 丙辰年 (Fire Dragon); 3114 or 2907 — to — 丁巳年 (Fire Snake); 3115 or 2908
- Coptic calendar: 133–134
- Discordian calendar: 1583
- Ethiopian calendar: 409–410
- Hebrew calendar: 4177–4178
- Hindu calendars
- Vikram Samvat: 473–474
- Shaka Samvat: 338–339
- Kali Yuga: 3517–3518
- Holocene calendar: 10417
- Iranian calendar: 205 BP – 204 BP
- Islamic calendar: 211 BH – 210 BH
- Javanese calendar: 301–302
- Julian calendar: 417; CDXVII
- Korean calendar: 2750
- Minguo calendar: 1495 before ROC 民前1495年
- Nanakshahi calendar: −1051
- Seleucid era: 728/729 AG
- Thai solar calendar: 959–960
- Tibetan calendar: མེ་ཕོ་འབྲུག་ལོ་ (male Fire-Dragon); 543 or 162 or −610 — to — མེ་མོ་སྦྲུལ་ལོ་ (female Fire-Snake); 544 or 163 or −609

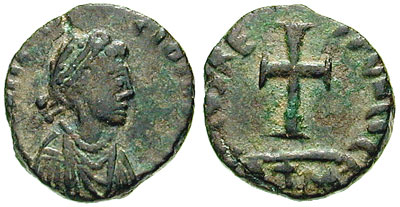
Coin of Galla Placidia

Year 417 (CDXVII) was a common year starting on Monday of the Julian calendar. At the time, it was known as the Year of the Consulship of Honorius and Constantius (or, less frequently, year 1170 Ab urbe condita). The denomination 417 for this year has been used since the early medieval period, when the Anno Domini calendar era became the prevalent method in Europe for naming years.

== Events ==
=== By place ===
==== Roman Empire ====
- January 1 – Emperor Honorius forces his half-sister Galla Placidia into marriage to Constantius, his general (magister militum). He is appointed patricius and becomes a prominent member of the House of Theodosius.
- Exuperantius suppresses the Bagaudae Revolt in Armorica.
- The Visigoths are granted Aquitaine, and become allies (foederati) of the Western Roman Empire. King Wallia establishes his capital at Toulouse.

==== Asia ====
- Nulji becomes king of the Korean kingdom of Silla.

=== By topic ===
==== Religion ====
- January – Pope Innocent I condemns Pelagianism, and excommunicates the ascetic Pelagius.
- March 12 – Innocent I dies after a 16-year reign in which he has restored relations between the sees of Rome and Antioch, enforced celibacy of the clergy, and maintained the right of the bishop of Rome to judge appeals from other churches. Innocent is succeeded by Zosimus as the 41st pope.

== Births ==
- Peter the Iberian, Georgian theologian and Saint (approximate date)
- Justa Grata Honoria, daughter of Constantius III (approximate date)

== Deaths ==
- March 12 – Pope Innocent I
- Li Gao, Chinese general of the state Western Liang (b. 351)
- Yao Hong, last emperor of the Qiang state Later Qin (b. 388)
