= Amandus (disambiguation) =

Amandus (died 679) was a Christian bishop and saint.

Amandus may also refer to:

- Amandus (fl. 285), co-leader with Aelianus (rebel) of a rebellion in Gaul
- Amandus, also called Abantus, admiral of the Licinian fleet at the Battle of the Hellespont (324)
- Saint Amandus of Strasbourg (died c. 355), first bishop of Strasbourg
- Saint Amandus of Bordeaux (early 5th century), bishop and correspondent of Paulinus of Nola
- Saint Amandus (6th century), hermit, teacher of Junian of Saint-Junien
- Amandus Adamson (1855–1929), Estonian sculptor and painter
- Amandus Augustus Abendroth (1767–1842), German jurist and mayor of Hamburg
- Amandus Holte (1888–1965), Norwegian trade unionist and politician
- Amandus Ivanschiz (1727–1758), Austrian composer
- Amandus Johnson (1877–1974), Swedish-American historian, author, and museum director
- Amandus Müllner (1774–1829), German critic and dramatic poet
- Amandus Polanus (1561–1610), German theologian
- Amandus Schibsted (1849–1913), Norwegian owner and chief editor Aftenposten
- Amandus Heinrich Christian Zietz (1840–1921), German zoologist and paleontologist
- Amandus (beetle), a genus of insects in the family Chrysomelidae
- Amandus (film), a 1966 Slovak film
