= 435 (disambiguation) =

435 may refer to:

- 435, the year.
- 435, the number of members of the United States House of Representatives.
- Area code 435
- Arriflex 435, a movie camera
- 435, song by Tyler, The Creator
- Joint Task Force 435, a former combatant command of United States Forces-Afghanistan
- Tin Tsz stop, station code

== See also ==
- 435th (disambiguation)
