= 441 =

441 in various calendars
Gregorian calendar	441; CDXLI
Ab urbe condita	1194
Assyrian calendar	5191
Balinese saka calendar	362–363
Bengali calendar	−153 – −152
Berber calendar	1391
Buddhist calendar	985
Burmese calendar	−197
Byzantine calendar	5949–5950
Chinese calendar	庚辰年 (Metal Dragon); 3138 or 2931 — to — 辛巳年 (Metal Snake); 3139 or 2932
Coptic calendar	157–158
Discordian calendar	1607
Ethiopian calendar	433–434
Hebrew calendar	4201–4202
- Hindu calendars
Vikram Samvat	497–498
Shaka Samvat	362–363
Kali Yuga	3541–3542
Holocene calendar	10441
Iranian calendar	181 BP – 180 BP
Islamic calendar	187 BH – 186 BH
Javanese calendar	325–326
Julian calendar	441; CDXLI
Korean calendar	2774
Minguo calendar	1471 before ROC 民前1471年
Nanakshahi calendar	−1027
Seleucid era	752/753 AG
Thai solar calendar	983–984
Tibetan calendar	ལྕགས་ཕོ་འབྲུག་ལོ་ (male Iron-Dragon); 567 or 186 or −586 — to — ལྕགས་མོ་སྦྲུལ་ལོ་ (female Iron-Snake); 568 or 187 or −585

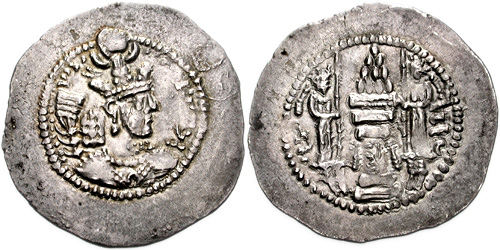
King Yazdegerd II (438–457)

Year 441 (CDXLI) was a common year starting on Wednesday of the Julian calendar. At the time, it was known as the Year of the Consulship of Seleucus without colleague (or, less frequently, year 1194 Ab urbe condita). The denomination 441 for this year has been used since the early medieval period, when the Anno Domini calendar era became the prevalent method in Europe for naming years.

== Events ==
=== By place ===
==== Byzantium ====
- Chrysaphius, chief minister, persuades Emperor Theodosius II at Constantinople to dismiss his sister Pulcheria, for her policy of exiling the Jews, and destroying their synagogues.
- Theodosius II sends the Eastern imperial fleet, under the command of the Romano-Goth Areobindus, into Sicilian waters, taking the Vandals by surprise.
- Pulcheria leaves for the seaport Hebdomon (Turkey), and becomes a nun to support Nestorianism in the Holy Land (Palestine).
- The Huns, led by Attila, attack Constanţa (modern Romania), one of the few remaining Roman forts on the northern bank of the Danube, and designated as a secure trading post. On a crowded market day, the Huns take the town by surprise and slaughter the garrison.

==== Europe ====
- The second Revolt of Bagaudae in Armorica under leading of Eudoxius is knocked down by the Alans. Eudoxius fled to the Huns.
- King Hermeric dies after a two-year illness; he is succeeded by his son Rechila, who becomes sole ruler over the Suebic Kingdom of Galicia.
- Rechila invades Baetica and conquers the capital Seville. The Romans are driven from the Iberian Peninsula with the exception of the Levante.
- November 8 – The first Council of Orange is convened under the guidance of Hilary of Arles in Orange (France).

==== Persia ====
- King Yazdegerd II of Persia signs a peace treaty after a short war with the Eastern Roman Empire. Theodosius II sends his commander, Anatolius, to conclude his terms and promise not to build any new fortifications along the border territories.

=== By topic ===
==== Religion ====
- Domnus II succeeds his uncle John as Patriarch of Antioch.

== Births ==
- Shen Yue, Chinese historian and statesman (d. 513)

== Deaths ==
- Hermeric, king of the Suebi
- John, Patriarch of Antioch
