= 437th =

437th may refer to:

- 437th Airlift Wing, active unit of the United States Air Force
- 437th Bombardment Squadron, a unit of the Alaska Air National Guard
- 437th Fighter-Interceptor Squadron, inactive United States Air Force unit
- 437th Operations Group, active United States Air Force unit

== See also ==
- 437 (number)
- 437, the year 437 (CDXXXVII) of the Julian calendar
- 437 BC
