= Mercatus =

Mercatus may refer to:

- Mercatus (bug), a genus of shield bugs in the subfamily Phyllocephalinae
- Mercatus (festival), a Roman festival

== See also ==
- Mercatus Center, a think tank at George Mason University
