= 437 =

437 in various calendars
- Gregorian calendar: 437; CDXXXVII
- Ab urbe condita: 1190
- Assyrian calendar: 5187
- Balinese saka calendar: 358–359
- Bengali calendar: −157 – −156
- Berber calendar: 1387
- Buddhist calendar: 981
- Burmese calendar: −201
- Byzantine calendar: 5945–5946
- Chinese calendar: 丙子年 (Fire Rat); 3134 or 2927 — to — 丁丑年 (Fire Ox); 3135 or 2928
- Coptic calendar: 153–154
- Discordian calendar: 1603
- Ethiopian calendar: 429–430
- Hebrew calendar: 4197–4198
- Hindu calendars
- Vikram Samvat: 493–494
- Shaka Samvat: 358–359
- Kali Yuga: 3537–3538
- Holocene calendar: 10437
- Iranian calendar: 185 BP – 184 BP
- Islamic calendar: 191 BH – 190 BH
- Javanese calendar: 321–322
- Julian calendar: 437; CDXXXVII
- Korean calendar: 2770
- Minguo calendar: 1475 before ROC 民前1475年
- Nanakshahi calendar: −1031
- Seleucid era: 748/749 AG
- Thai solar calendar: 979–980
- Tibetan calendar: མེ་ཕོ་བྱི་བ་ལོ་ (male Fire-Rat); 563 or 182 or −590 — to — མེ་མོ་གླང་ལོ་ (female Fire-Ox); 564 or 183 or −589

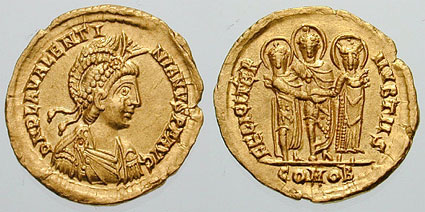
Solidus of Valentinian III celebrating his marriage to Licinia Eudoxia

Year 437 (CDXXXVII) was a common year starting on Friday of the Julian calendar. At the time, it was known as the Year of the Consulship of Aetius and Sigisvultus (or, less frequently, year 1190 Ab urbe condita). The denomination 437 for this year has been used since the early medieval period, when the Anno Domini calendar era became the prevalent method in Europe for naming years.

== Events ==
=== By place ===
==== Europe ====
- Flavius Aetius, Roman general (magister militum) beats Tibatto and ends temporary the uprising of the Baguads. Then he secures the besieged city of Narbonne (Southern Gaul) against King Theodoric I. He concludes a peace treaty with the Visigoths, and becomes consul for the second time.
- July 2 – Valentinian III, age 18, rules as emperor over the Western Roman Empire. His mother Galla Placidia ends her regency, but continues to exercise political influence until her death in 450.
- October 29 – Valentinian III cements an alliance with the eastern emperor, Theodosius II, by marrying his daughter Licinia Eudoxia in Constantinople. This marks the reunion of the two branches of the House of Theodosius.
- Battle of Wallop: Ambrosius Aurelianus, leader of the Romano-British, defeats the Anglo Saxons under King Vortigern. He is given all the kingdoms of the western side of Britain (according to Historia Brittonum).

==== Mesoamerica ====
- K'inich Yax K'uk' Mo' dies after an 11-year reign. He is the founder and first ruler of the pre-Columbian Maya civilization centered at Copán (modern Honduras).

=== By topic ===
==== Religion ====
- A synod at Constantinople attempts to impinge on the Pope's rights in Illyria. Proclus tries to implement the synod's decisions, and Pope Sixtus III reminds the Illyrian bishops of their obligations to his vicar at Thessaloniki.

== Births ==
- Childeric I, king of the Salian Franks (approximate date)
- Remigius, bishop of Reims (approximate date)

== Deaths ==
- Li Jingshou, princess of the Xiongnu state Northern Liang
