= 435th =

435th may refer to:

- 435th Air Ground Operations Wing, the first USAFE wing solely dedicated to supporting battlefield Airmen
- 435th Bombardment Squadron, an inactive United States Air Force unit
- 435th Fighter Training Squadron (435 FTS), part of the 12th Flying Training Wing based at Randolph Air Force Base, Texas
- 435th Operations Group, an inactive United States Air Force unit
- 435th Security Forces Squadron (435th SFS), a United States Air Force unit capable of overland airlift, air assault, or airborne insertion into crisis situations
- 435th (Mixed) Heavy Anti-Aircraft Battery, Royal Artillery, a British air defence unit formed during World War II

== See also ==
- 435 (number)
- 435, the year 435 (CDXXXV) of the Julian calendar
- 435 BC
