= Second Bagaudae Revolt =

- Part of the Fall of the Western Roman Empire
- Campaign of the Roman army
Date	435 - 441
Location	France

Belligerents
Bagaudae	Roman army Alan auxiliary forces

Commanders and leaders
Tibatto; Eudoxius	Litorius; Goar

The Second Bagaudae Revolt was an armed conflict in northwestern Gaul, where rebel groups, called Bagaudae, opposed the imperial government in the period between 435 and 441. The conflict consisted of several uprisings and they took place in a very turbulent period in which the Western Roman Empire had to focus its attention on several fronts.

== Background ==
=== Uprisings ===
An important characteristic of the downfall process that the Western Roman Empire was going through in the 5th century were the various uprisings that took place throughout the empire. That unrest is sometimes seen as a class struggle, but had several reasons, because among the rebels there were also expropriated aristocrats. Usually the high tax burden, the unsafe situation or the mandatory conscription for the Roman army is seen as the basis for the uprisings.

The Bagaudae were not a tightly organized movement, but loose groups of peasants, poor serfs, escaped slaves and local elites, who turned away from Roman rule. In Armorica (about present-day Brittany and parts of western France) there had already been an uprising in the period between 409 and 417. This uprising is known as the Bagaudae Revolt and was stabilized by General Constantius III with the help of the Goths.

The civil wars in that period were a great bloodletting for the Western Army that was decreased significantly in manpower. But the loss of the province Africa to the Vandals in 432 also caused problems for the West. Besides grain deliveries, it lost the large tax revenues of the rich province, with which it financed it expensive army of military forces. In the Roman civil war against Bonifatius and Galla Placidia, Aëtius could only triumph, thanks to the support he received from a Hun army. After his victory, Aetius became the actual ruler in the West, but he lacked opportunities to strengthen the empire. The state treasury was empty and its army depended on foederati (barbarian troops).

=== Political situation ===
Not much is certainly known about the direct cause of the Bagaudae uprisings, because the contemporary sources are scarce and summary. Nevertheless, much about the political context is clear. The Western Roman was situated in a crisis, both administratively as well as militarily. The state collected taxes, but fell short in enforcing security and justice. In large parts of Gaul, governance was fragmented; cities, large landowners and military commanders operated autonomously. The declining Roman control led to various population groups rebelling against the legitimate government. The Gallic Chronicle of 452 shows that a large part of the population at that time were armed groups.

== The Uprising ==
Tibatto is mentioned in the sources as the leader of the uprising in 435. According to Thompson, who wrote extensively about the Bagaudae and their uprisings, the rebels were not simply bush robbers, but an organized movement of the lower classes striving for independence. Probably the uprising began with the open refusal to pay taxes, after which the officials were expelled and the weapons were seized. The uprising spread like an oil spill in northwestern Gaul. The Roman garrisons were expelled or joined the rebels. It didn't stop there, because a short time later both the Gothic and Burgundian foederati rebelled in Gaul.

Initially, there was no response from the imperial army. It was not until 436 that they took action. The focus was first on the Burgundian and Bagaudae rebellion. Aetius moved north with most of his army where he split the troops in two; he would take on the Burgundians himself, leaving it to his subordinate general Litorius to eliminate the Bagaudae.

=== The campaign of Litorius ===
About the course of Litorius campaign we are once again briefly informed. Prosper only reports that Litorius suppressed the Bagaudic uprising in Armorica in 436. Historians suspect that Litorius had Huns at his disposal and that his campaign mainly consisted of skirmishes with the Bagaudae militias of farmers and slaves without almost military training who could not match the experienced Huns. He managed to capture a number of their leaders, including Tibatto who was taken to Ravenna. At the beginning of 437 Litorius and his troops moved south to compete against the Visigoths who besieged Narbona.

=== The Alans of Goar ===
Besides the Roman army of Litorius, the Alans under Goar were also active in Armorica. The circumstances of the Alans' settlement in 'Gallia Ulterior', the area above Orleans up to the Seine, can be reconstructed with a high degree of certainty, although the dating varies between 437 (Thompson) and 448 (Hughes). The Bagaudian revolt undoubtedly played a role in this. By settling the Alans here, the Tractus Armoricani was divided into two parts, thus preventing the Bagaudians in the western part of the Tractus from uniting with those in the eastern part.

=== Continuation of the Revolt ===
The territory in Gallia Ulterior ceded to the Alans may have been the territory Tibatto supported, and the donation may have been a means of punishing and policing the rebels, as well as a reward for Goar's followers. According to the sources, the Alans treated the inhabitants of the region ruthlessly. Although the land was intended to be divided between Romans and barbarians, many Romans were forcibly expelled. In 441, this resulted in a new outbreak of revolt. The revolt was this time led by Eudoxius and was crushed by the Alan auxiliary forces.

== Sources ==
- Prosper, Chronicon
- Gallic Chronicle of 452
- Hydatius, Chronicon
- Constantius of Lyon, Vita Sancti Germani
- Salvianus, The Gubernatione Dei

== Bibliography ==
- Bachrach, B. S. (1967). Alans in Gaul. Cambridge University Press.
- Hughes, Ian (2012). Aetius: Attila's Nemesis, Chapter 9 the Fall of Africa. Pen & Sword Military. ISBN 978-1848842793.
- Thompson, E. A. (1984). Saint Germanus of Auxerre and the end of Roman Britain. Woodbridge, Suffolk: Boydell Press.
- Thompson, E. A. (November 1956). "The Settlement of the Barbarians in Southern Gaul". Journal of Roman Studies. 46 (1–2): 65–75. doi:10.2307/297966.
- Thompson, E.A. (1982), Romans and Barbarians: The Decline of the Western Empire
- Lambert, David (2013), Salvian and the Bagaudae, in Gallien in Spätantike und Frühmittelalter (pp. 255–276), DOI:10.1515/9783110260779.255
