= Exuperantius of Poitiers =

Exuperantius was a Roman ruler or soldier in Gaul in the early 5th century. He came from Poitiers and is associated with the defeat of the Bagaudae Revolt in 417. He was the father of the law student Palladius and a family member of the 5th-century writer Rutilius Namatianus. It is possible that he later was promoted to prefect of the Praetorian prefecture of Gaul.

== Sources ==
What we know about him is summary and mainly comes from a single source, causing uncertainty and discussion about his performance in history. The most important mention comes from the latter Rutilius, who in a hymn of praise praises Exuperantius as someone who "restored order" in Gaul. In another source, Prosper Tiro mentioned Exuperantius who, as prefect of the Praetorian Prefecture of Gaul, was killed during a military uprising in the city Arelate, and that no action was taken against this by Emperor Joannes There is no hard evidence of this is the same person here.

== History ==
According to Rutilius, Exuperantius was sent to Gaul to restore order. In 417 he was in Amorica and managed to suppress the revolt of the Bagaudae militarily. The Bagaudae were not a tightly organized group, but rather loose uprisings of farmers, deserters and local communities resisting heavy taxes, instability and the failing Roman authority. Exuperantius (temporarily) restored Roman authority in the area. Unless he had a special assignment, he was probably vicaris Galliarum.

== Primary sources ==
- Prosper Tiro, Epitoma Chronicon
- Rutilius Namatianus, The Redutu Suo

== Bibliography ==
- Jones, A.H.M.; Martindale, J. R.; Morris, J. A (1971). The Prosopography of the Later Roman Empire. Cambridge University Press.
