= 132nd (Mixed) Heavy Anti-Aircraft Regiment, Royal Artillery =

132nd (Mixed) HAA Regiment, RA
- Royal Artillery cap badge
- Active: 22 September 1941 – 31 May 1945
- Country: United Kingdom
- Branch: British Army
- Role: Air defence
- Size: Regiment (3–4 batteries)
- Part of: Anti-Aircraft Command; 21st Army Group
- Engagements: Air defence of the UK; Air defence of Brussels

132nd (Mixed) Heavy Anti-Aircraft Regiment was an air defence unit of Britain's Royal Artillery formed during World War II. It was one of the first 'Mixed' regiments in which women of the Auxiliary Territorial Service were integrated into the unit's personnel. It defended London and South-East England against aerial attack until it deployed to Belgium in January 1945 to defend Brussels against V-1 flying bombs.

== Organisation ==
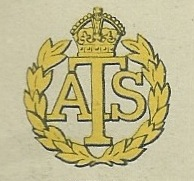
Auxiliary Territorial Service cap badge

By 1941, after two years of war Anti-Aircraft Command, tasked with defending the UK against air attack, was suffering a manpower shortage. In April its commander-in-chief, Lieutenant-General Sir Frederick 'Tim' Pile, proposed to overcome this by utilising the women of the Auxiliary Territorial Service (ATS). The ATS was by law a non-combatant service, but it was decided that Defence Regulations permitted the employment of women in anti-aircraft (AA) roles other than actually firing the guns. They worked the radar and plotting instruments, range-finders and predictors, ran command posts and communications, and carried out many other duties. With the increasing automation of heavy AA (HAA) guns, including gun-laying, fuze-setting and ammunition loading under remote control from the predictor, the question of who actually fired the gun became blurred as the war progressed. The ATS rank and file, if not always their officers, took to the new role with enthusiasm and 'Mixed' batteries and regiments with the ATS supplying two-thirds of their personnel quickly proved a success.

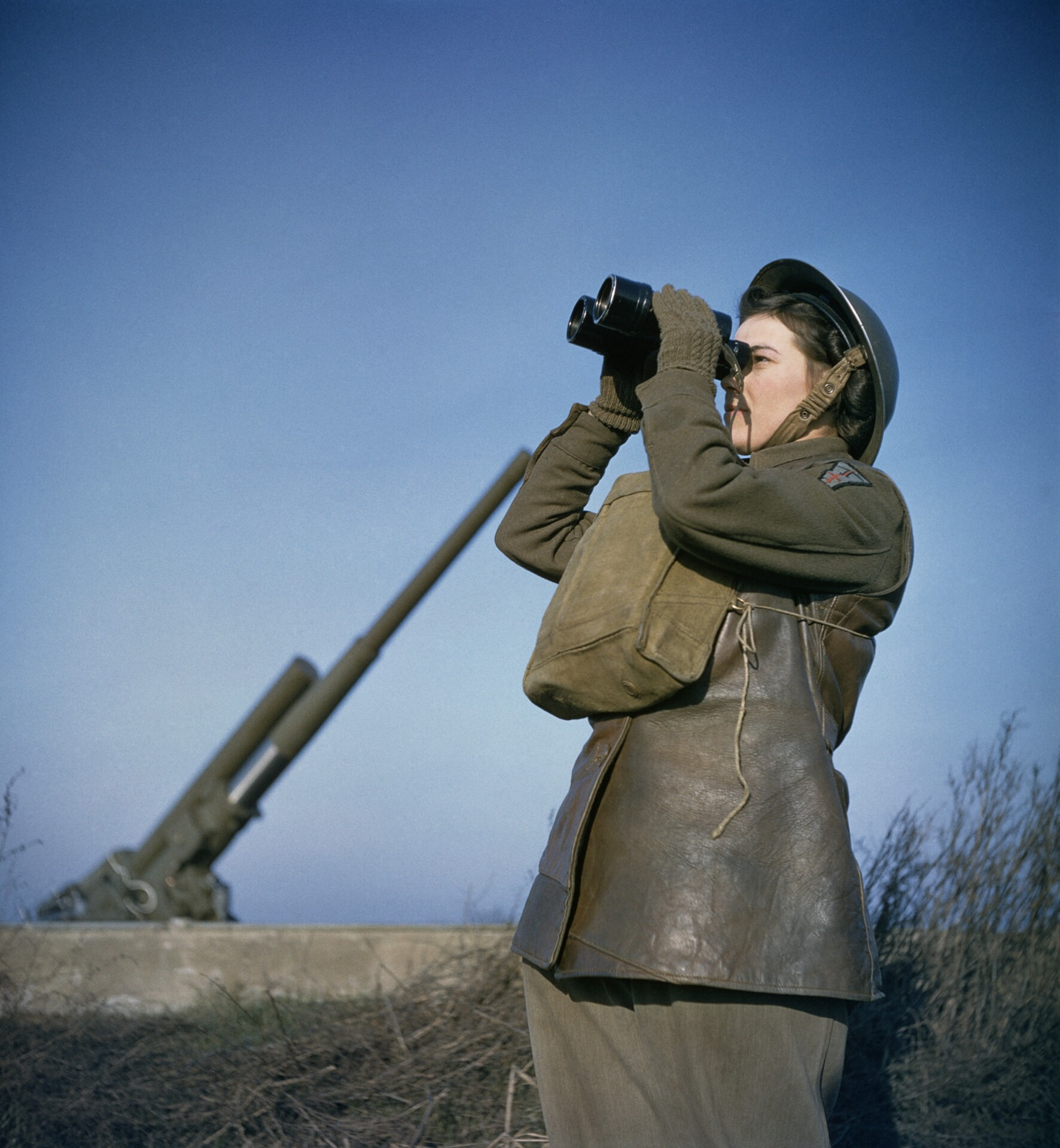
An ATS member of a mixed 3.7-inch HAA gun battery, December 1942, wearing the 1st AA Division shoulder patch.

The first of these new units, 435 (Mixed) HAA Battery, took over an operational gun site in Richmond Park, south-west London, in August 1941, and a full regiment of converted batteries soon followed. The next group of mixed regiments was formed on 22 September 1941, including 132nd (Mixed) Heavy Anti-Aircraft Regiment, whose regimental headquarters formed in Highgate, North London. It was then joined by the following batteries:

- 435 (M) HAA Bty (the original mixed battery) joined from 105th HAA Rgt on 6 October 1941
- 450 (M) HAA Bty, formed on 10 July 1941 at 205th HAA Training Rgt, Arborfield, from a cadre of experienced officers and gunners supplied by 105th HAA Rgt, became mixed on 13 August and was regimented with 132nd HAA Rgt on 6 October
- 457 (M) HAA Bty, formed on 10 July 1941 at 206th HAA Training Rgt, Arborfield, from a cadre supplied by 77th (Welsh) HAA Rgt, became mixed on 27 August and was regimented with 132nd HAA Rgt on 3 November
- 469 (M) HAA Bty, formed on 7 August 1941 at 206th HAA Training Rgt from a cadre supplied by 113th HAA Rgt, became mixed on 24 September and was regimented with 132nd HAA Rgt on 24 November

== Deployment ==
Formation sign of 1st AA Division.

The new regiment was assigned to 26th (London) Anti-Aircraft Brigade, part of 1st Anti-Aircraft Division operating the London Inner Artillery Zone (IAZ) of defences.

553 (M) HAA Battery, formed on 16 April 1942 at Arborfield by 205th HAA Training Rgt from another cadre supplied by 105th HAA Rgt, was due to have been regimented with 132nd HAA Rgt by 26 June, but there was a shortage of ATS recruits and its formation was delayed. It eventually joined 163rd (M) HAA Rgt. 132nd HAA Regiment supplied another cadre to 24th HAA Training Rgt at Blackdown as the basis of a new 565 (M) HAA Bty formed on 10 June 1942; this also joined 163rd (M) HAA Rgt.

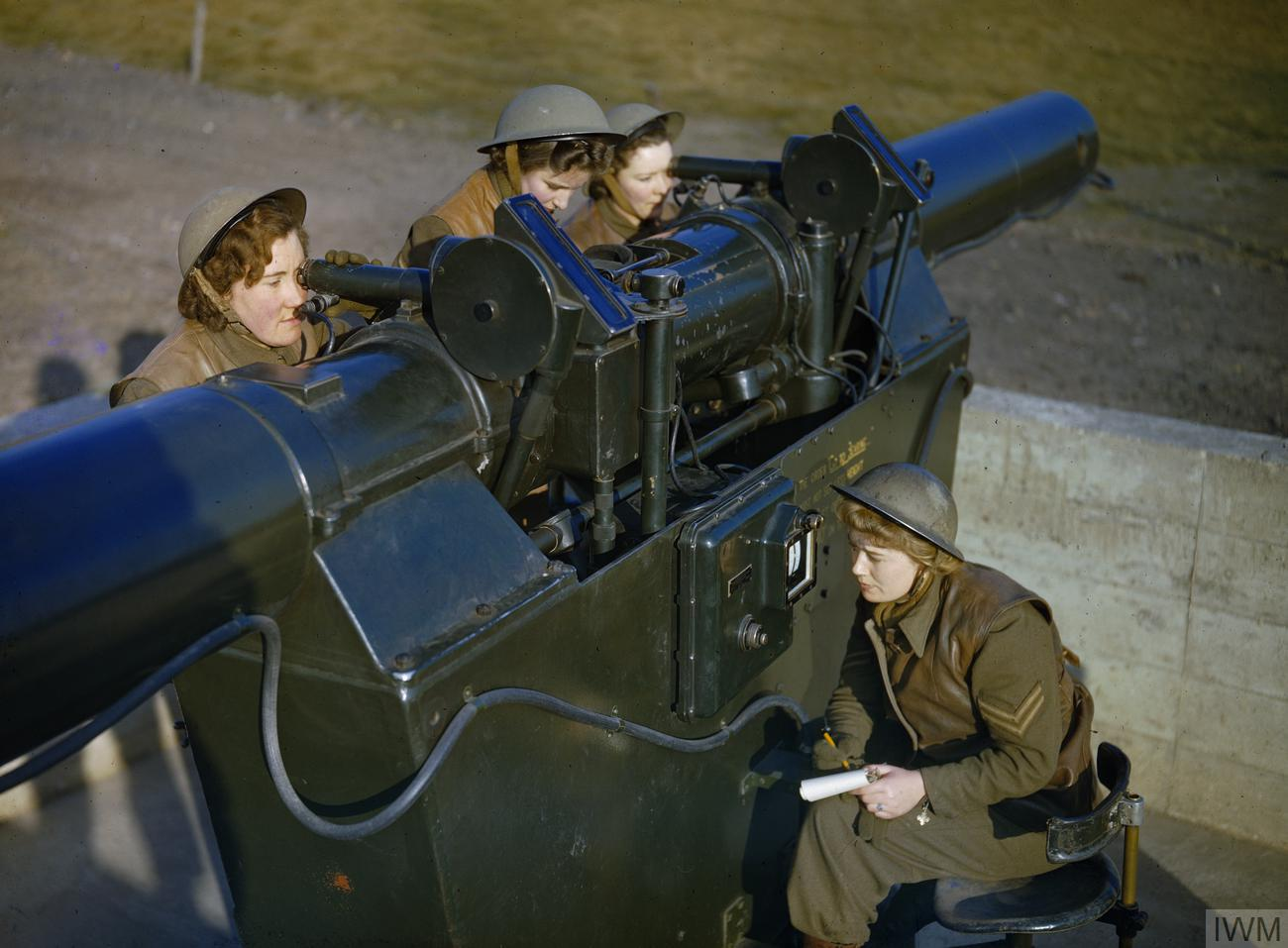
ATS women operating a height and range finder on an HAA gun site, December 1942.

The London Blitz had ended in May 1941 and for nearly two years the city was hardly affected by bombing raids while the Luftwaffe concentrated on coastal targets. A few sporadic attacks were made on London during 1943, by conventional bombers at night on 17 January, 3 March and 16 April, by daylight Fighter-bombers on 12 March, and by night again on 7 and 20 October. The Luftwaffe began a new bombing campaign against London in early 1944 (the Baby Blitz), when the city was subjected to 14 raids between 21 January and 18 April. By now the night fighter defences and the London IAZ were well organised and the attackers suffered heavy losses for relatively small results. On 13 February, for example, only six out of 115 aircraft reached London, the rest being driven off. Five raids in the third week of February varying in strength from 100 to 140 aircraft were met by intense AA fire from the Thames Estuary in to the IAZ and fewer than half reached the city; 13 were shot down by AA Command, 15 by Royal Air Force night-fighters, and one 'kill' was shared.

== Operation Diver ==
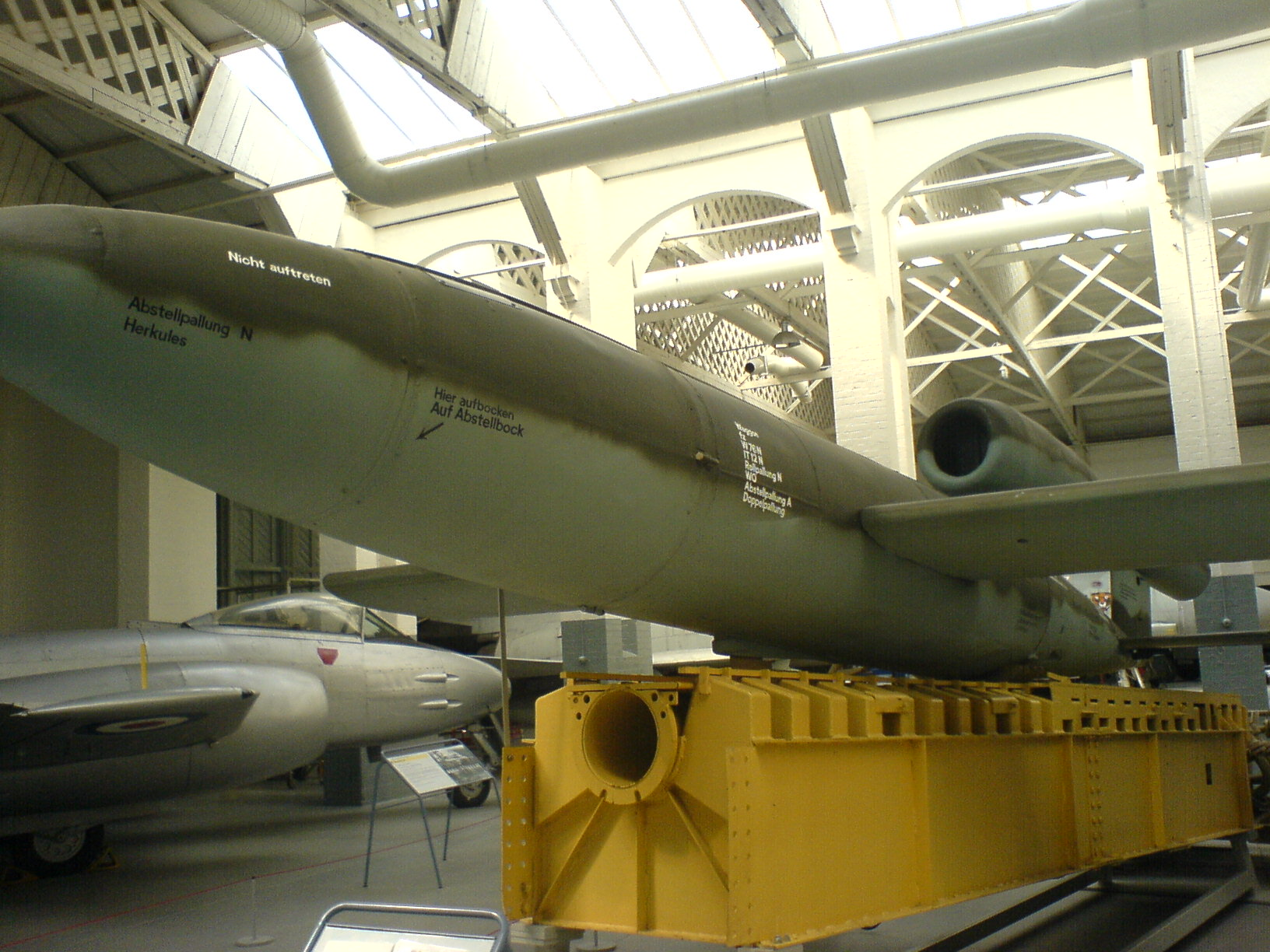
A V-1 and launching ramp section on display at the Imperial War Museum Duxford.

More significant were the V-1 flying bombs, codenamed 'Divers', which began to be launched against London from Northern France soon after the Allies launched their invasion of Normandy (Operation Overlord) on D-Day. V-1s (known to Londoners as 'Doodlebugs') presented AA Command's biggest challenge since the Blitz. Defences had been planned against this new form of attack (Operation Diver), but the missiles' small size, high speed and awkward height presented a severe problem for AA guns. After two weeks' experience AA Command carried out a major reorganisation, stripping guns from the London IAZ and other parts of the UK and repositioning them along the South Coast to target V-1s coming in over the English Channel, where the gun-laying radar worked best and where a 'downed' V-1 would cause no damage. The introduction of VT Proximity fuzes also increased the 'kill rate'. 132nd (M) HAA Regiment transferred to 40 AA Brigade, which was moved into the V-1 flightpath. The whole process involved moving hundreds of guns and vehicles and thousands of servicemen and women, but a new 8-gun HAA battery site could be established in 48 hours. After moving the mobile 3.7-inch HAA guns to the coast, these were progressively replaced by the static Mark IIC model, which had power traverse, accompanied by the most sophisticated Radar No 3 Mark V (the SCR-584 radar set) and No 10 Predictor (the all-electric Bell Labs AAA Computer). In early August 132nd (M) HAA Rgt came under the command of 102 AA Brigade, which had been scheduled to take part in 'Overlord' but had been diverted to reinforce the 'Diver' defences in South East England. The guns were constantly in action and the success rate of the HAA batteries against 'Divers' rose progressively until late summer, when the launching sites in Normandy were overrun by 21st Army Group.

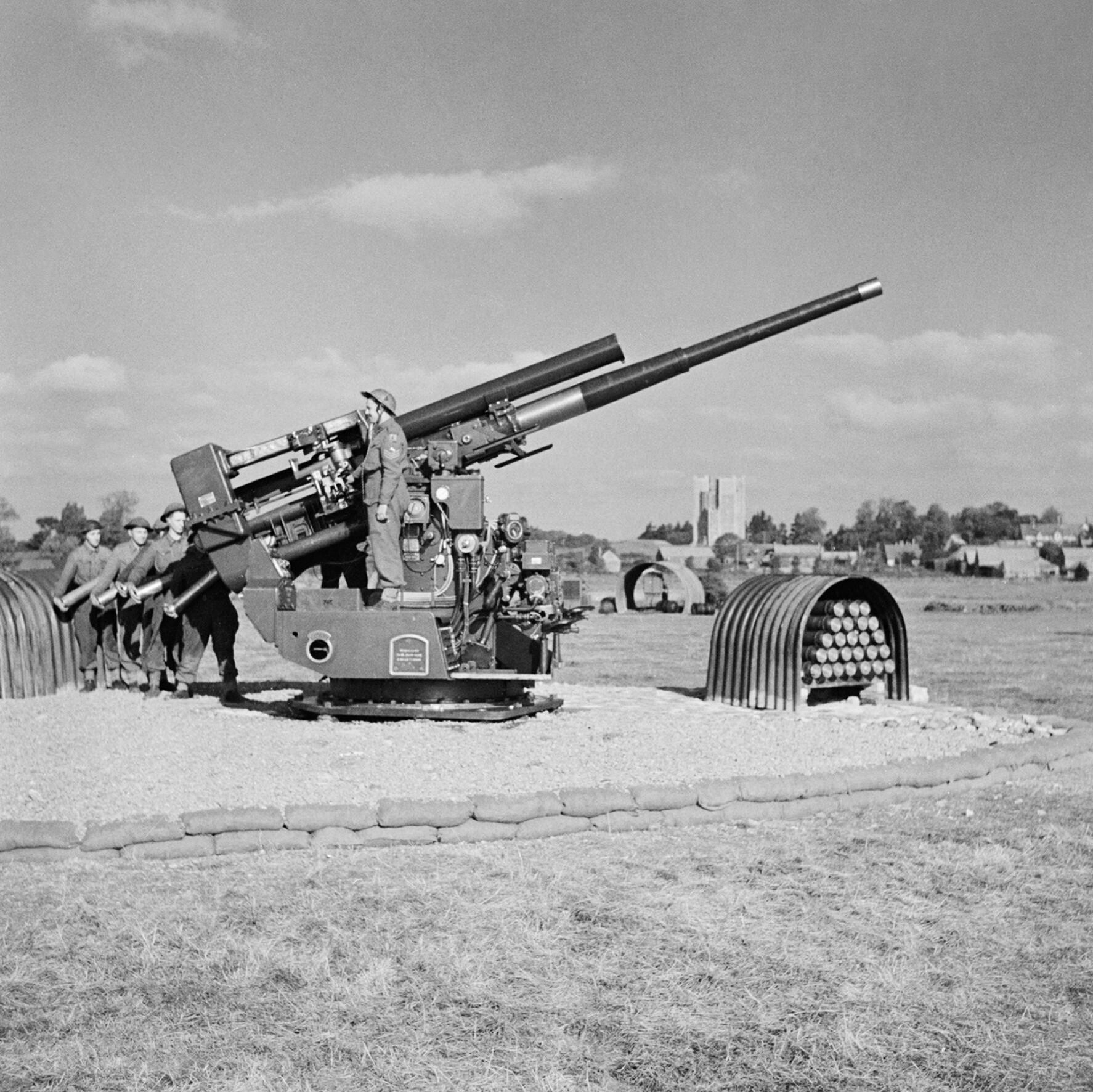
A static Mk IIC 3.7-inch gun on a Pile platform during Operation Diver.

As the Luftwaffe switched to air-launching V-1s from over the North Sea, so AA Command had to uproot its static guns and redeploy them again in East Anglia. 132nd (M) HAA Regiment initially remained on the South Coast, switching to 43 AA Brigade in October, and then when that was disbanded reverting to 26 (London) AA Bde. 469 (M) HAA Battery left 132nd (M) HAA Rgt and became independent on 30 November 1944.

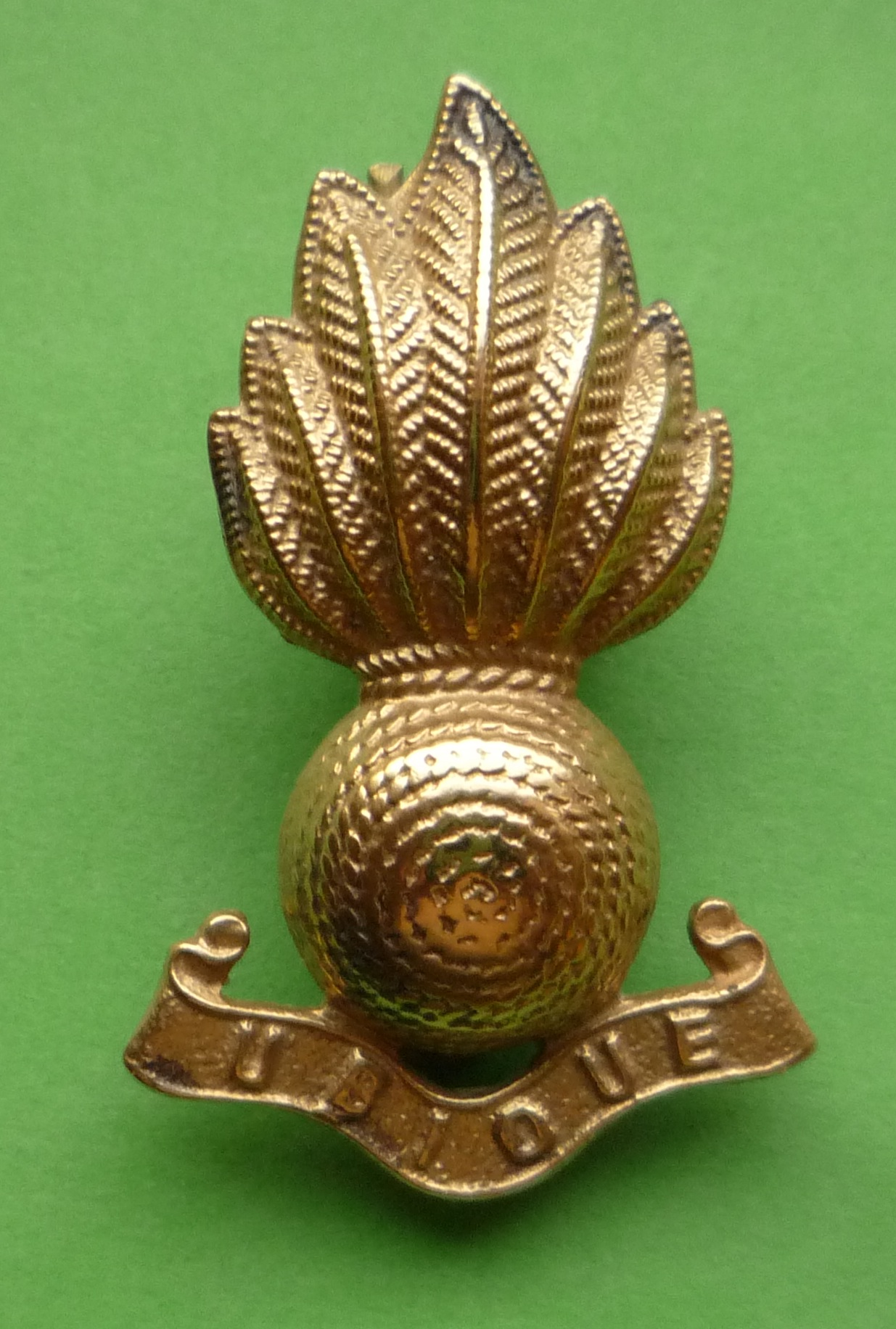
Brass collar badge of the Royal Artillery

== Brussels 'X' deployment ==
Once 21st Army Group had captured Brussels and Antwerp, these cities became targets for V-1s launched from within Germany, and anti-Diver or 'X' defences had to be established. AA Command's experience had shown that the power-operated, remotely controlled Mk IIC 3.7-inch gun, with automatic fuze-setting, SCR 584 radar and Predictor No 10 were required to deal effectively with V-1s, but 21st Army Group's mobile HAA units did not have experience with this equipment. 132nd HAA Regiment was the second Mixed unit sent from AA Command to reinforce the Brussels 'X' defences in January 1945. It deployed in bitter winter weather: it was so cold that the oil in the guns' hydraulic power systems froze. The Brussels 'X' defences under 101 AA Brigade involved an outer line of Wireless Observer Units sited 40 miles (64 km) to 50 miles (80 km) in front of the guns to give 8 minutes' warning, then Local Warning (LW) stations positioned half way, equipped with radar to begin plotting individual missiles. Finally there was an inner belt of Observation Posts (OPs), about 20,000 yards (18,000 m) in front of the guns to give visual confirmation that the tracked target was a missile. The LW stations and OPs were operated by teams from the AA regiments. Radar-controlled searchlights were deployed to assist in identification and engagement of missiles at night. Unlike the anti-Diver guns firing over the English Channel or North Sea, VT fuzes could not be employed by the HAA batteries at Brussels because of the risk of casualties to troops and civilians under the missiles' flightpath. The success rate of the Brussels X defences had been low at first, but after the arrival of Mk IIC guns and experienced crews from AA Command the results improved considerably, with best results in February and March 1945. (101 AA Bde handed over command to 50 AA Bde for the last few weeks.) The number of missiles launched at Brussels dropped rapidly as 21st Army Group continued its advance, and in the last week the AA defences destroyed 97.5 per cent of those reaching the defence belt.

The war in Europe ended on VE Day (8 May 1945) and 132nd (Mixed) HAA Regiment and its three batteries were disbanded on 31 May.

== Insignia ==
While the male members of the regiment wore the Royal Artillery's 'gun' cap badge, the women wore the ATS cap badge, but in addition they wore the RA's 'grenade' collar badge as a special badge above the left breast pocket of the tunic. Both sexes wore the white RA lanyard on the right shoulder.
