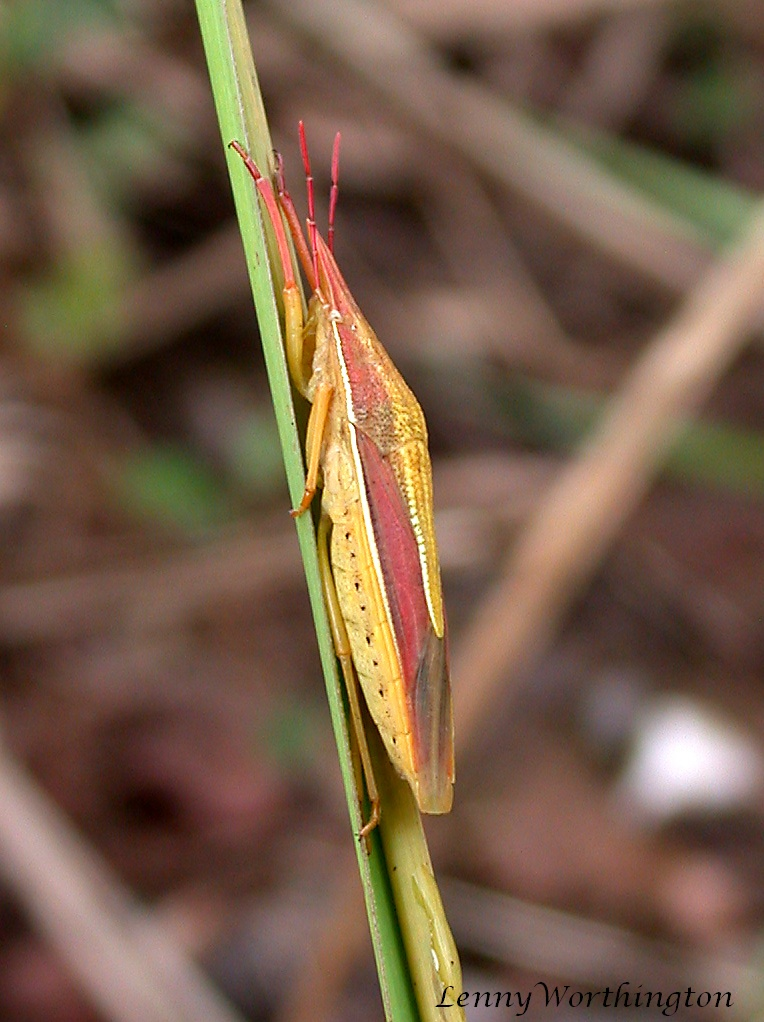
- Megarrhamphus truncatus, Thailand

Scientific classification
- Kingdom: Animalia
- Phylum: Arthropoda
- Class: Insecta
- Order: Hemiptera
- Suborder: Heteroptera
- Family: Pentatomidae
- Subfamily: Phyllocephalinae
- Tribe: Megarrhamphini
- Genus: Megarrhamphus; Bergroth, 1891

Synonyms
- Megarhynchus Laporte, 1833; Megarrhampus Ahmad & Kamaluddin, 1982

= Megarrhamphus =

Genus of shield-bugs

Megarrhamphus is a genus of Asian shield bugs in the subfamily Phyllocephalinae and typical of the tribe Megarrhamphini, erected by Ernst Evald Bergroth in 1891.

== Species ==
The following are included in BioLib.cz:

1. Megarrhamphus bengalensis Ahmad & Kamaluddin, 1988
2. Megarrhamphus fuscus (Vollenhoven, 1868)
3. Megarrhamphus hastatus (Fabricius, 1803) - type species
4. Megarrhamphus intermedius (Vollenhoven, 1868)
5. Megarrhamphus ismaili (Abbasi, 1986)
6. Megarrhamphus limatus (Herrich-Schäffer, 1851)
7. Megarrhamphus tibialis Yang, 1934
8. Megarrhamphus truncatus (Westwood, 1837)
