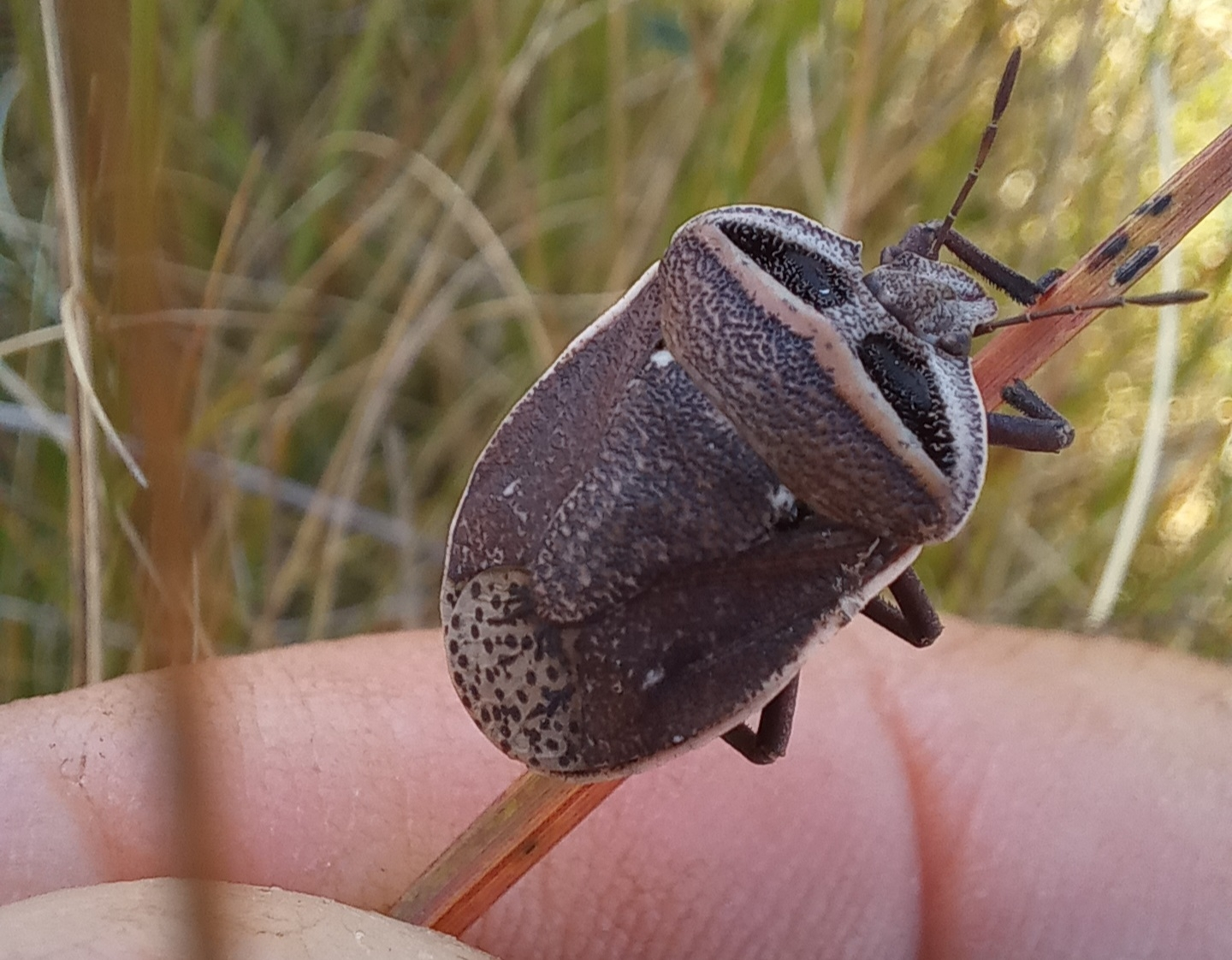
- Eonymia foveata

Scientific classification
- Kingdom: Animalia
- Phylum: Arthropoda
- Class: Insecta
- Order: Hemiptera
- Suborder: Heteroptera
- Superfamily: Pentatomoidea
- Family: Pentatomidae
- Subfamily: Phyllocephalinae; Amyot & Serville, 1843

= Phyllocephalinae =

Subfamily of true bugs

The Phyllocephalinae are a subfamily of shield bugs erected by Amyot and Serville in 1843.

== Tribes and genera ==
BioLib lists the following genera in four tribes:

=== Cressonini ===
Auth.: Kamaluddin & Ahmad, 1991

1. Cressona Dallas, 1851
2. Kafubu Schouteden, 1962
3. Lamtoplax Linnavuori, 1982
4. Melampodius Distant, 1901
5. Nimboplax Linnavuori, 1982
6. Uddmania Bergroth, 1915

=== Megarrhamphini ===
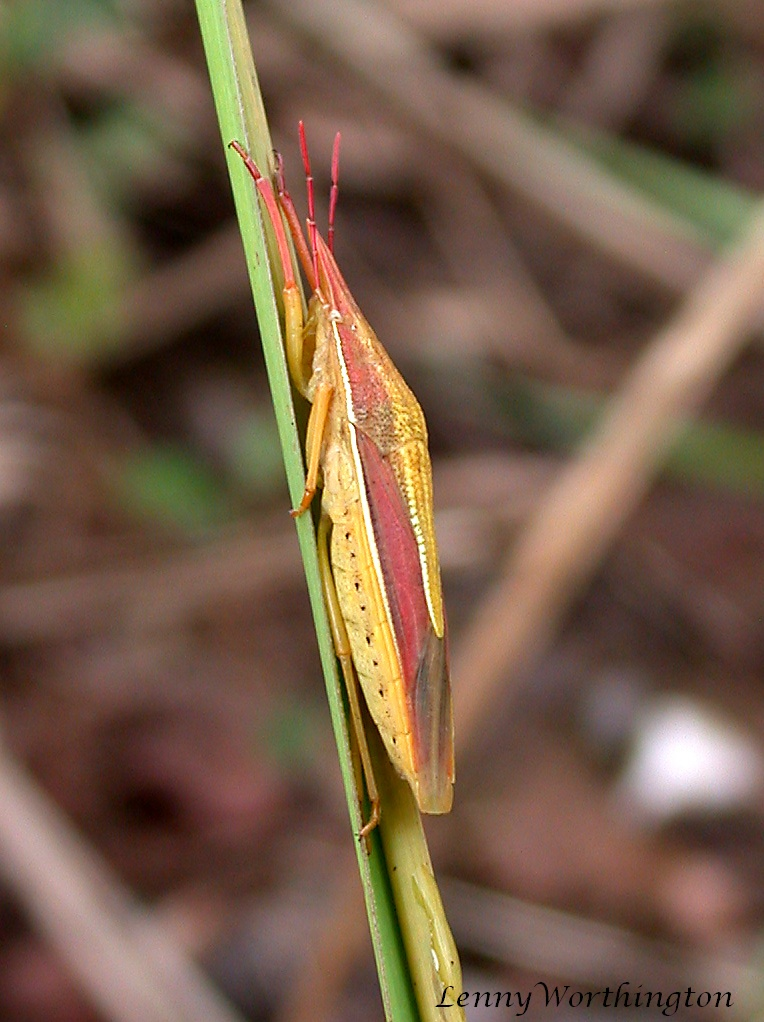
Megarrhamphus truncatus

Auth.: Ahmad, 1981

1. Bakerorandolotus Ahmad & Kamaluddin, 1978
2. Megarrhamphus Bergroth, 1891
3. Randolotus Distant, 1902

=== Phyllocephalini ===
Auth.: Amyot & Serville, 1843

1. Basicryptus Herrich-Schäffer, 1844
2. Borrichias Distant, 1910
3. Chalcopis Kirkaldy, 1909
4. Dalsira Amyot & Serville, 1843
5. Delocephalus Distant, 1881
6. Dichelorhinus Stål, 1853
7. Diplorhinus Amyot & Serville, 1843
8. Eonymia Linnavuori, 1982
9. Frisimelica Distant, 1900
10. Gonopsimorpha Yang, 1934
11. Gonopsis Amyot & Serville, 1843
12. Jayma Rider, 1998
13. Kaffraria Kirkaldy, 1909
14. Katongoplax Linnavuori, 1982
15. Lobopeltista Schouteden, 1905
16. Macrina Amyot & Serville, 1843
17. Magwamba Distant, 1910
18. Mercatus Distant, 1902
19. Metocryptus Linnavuori, 1982
20. Minchamia Gross, 1976
21. Nazeeriana Ahmad & Kamaluddin, 1978
22. Neoschyzops Ahmad & Kamaluddin, 1990
23. Penedalsira Linnavuori, 1982
24. Phyllocephala Laporte, 1833
25. Roebournea Schouteden, 1906
26. Salvianus Distant, 1902
27. Sandehana Distant, 1898
28. Schismatops Dallas, 1851
29. Schyzops Spinola, 1837
30. Storthogaster Karsch, 1892
31. Tantia Distant, 1910
32. Tshibalaka Schouteden, 1963

=== Tetrodini ===
Auth.: Ahmad, 1981

1. Gellia Stål, 1865
2. Tetroda Amyot & Serville, 1843
3. Tetrodias Kirkaldy, 1909

=== unplaced genera ===
- Thalagmus Stål
