= Cressona =

Scientific classification
- Kingdom: Animalia
- Phylum: Arthropoda
- Clade: Pancrustacea
- Class: Insecta
- Order: Hemiptera
- Suborder: Heteroptera
- Family: Pentatomidae
- Subfamily: Phyllocephalinae
- Tribe: Cressonini
- Genus: Cressona; Dallas, 1851

Genus of shield bugs

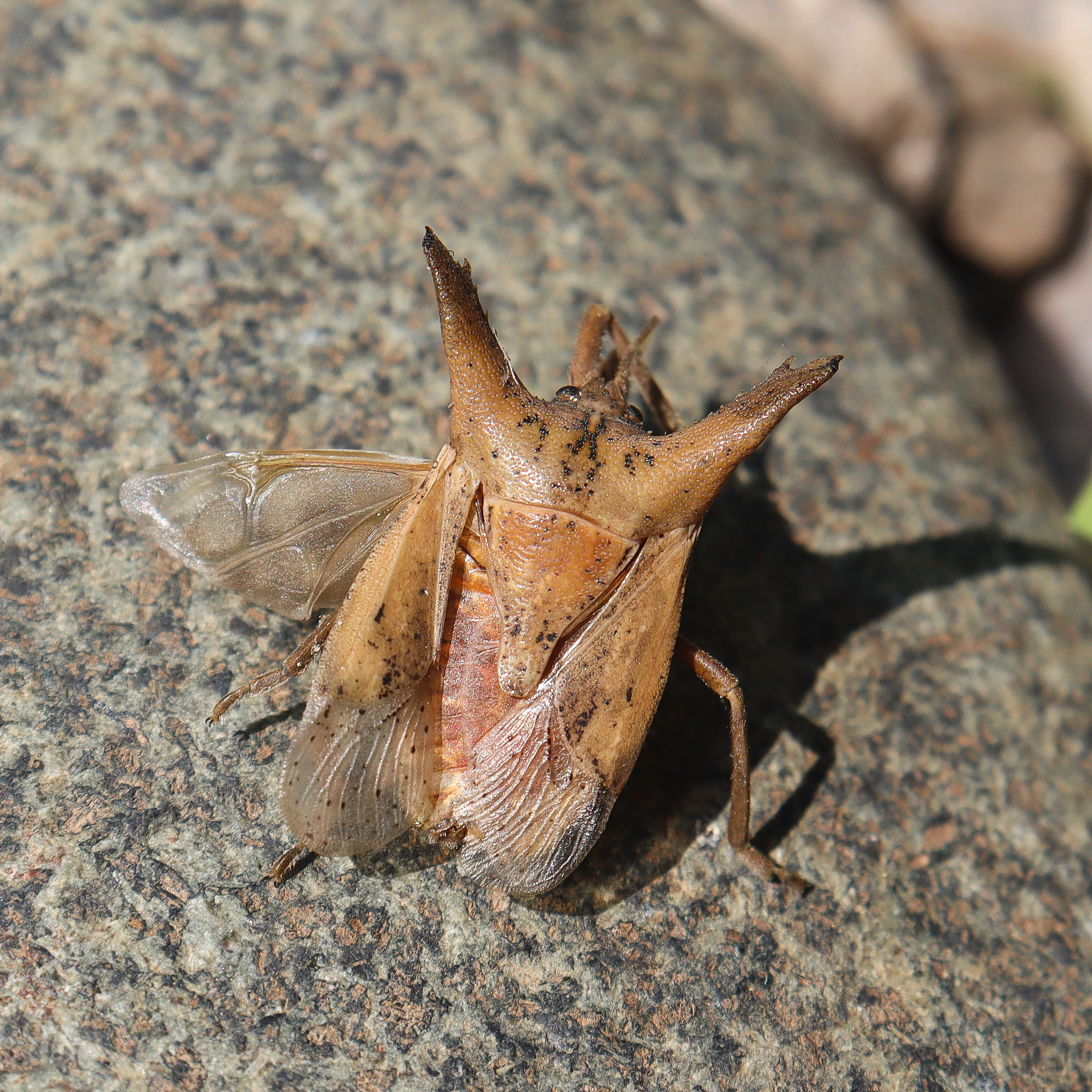
Image of Cressona

Cressona is a genus of shield bugs in the subfamily Phyllocephalinae, erected by William Sweetland Dallas in 1851.

== Species ==
The following are included in BioLib.cz:

1. Cressona divaricata L.Y. Zheng & Zou, 1982
2. Cressona rufa Zhang & Lin, 1984
3. Cressona valida Dallas, 1851 - type species, Myanmar
