= Tibatto =

Tibatto (sometimes spelled Tibaton or Tibattio) is a 5th century Bagaudae leader. The Gallic Chronicle of 452 calls him the leader of the great uprising of the Bagaudae (rebellious farmers, slaves and deserters) that took place between 435 and 437 in Armorica (present-day Brittany and the Loire Valley). This uprising was fought by the Roman general Flavius Aetius.

Under the leadership of Tibatto, the Bagaudae behaved as an independent power; there are indications that they were minting their own coins to underline their rejection of imperial authority. His movement was part of the so-called "Second Bagauden Uprising", which arose from the instability after the Germanic raids and the high tax burden in the crumbling West Roman Empire.

== Sources ==
Tibatto is only specifically mentioned in the Chronica Gallica of 452. Other sources, such as the poet Merobaudes, do speak of the victories of General Aetius over the Bagauds, but do not mention Tibatto by name. According to Thompson who wrote extensively about the Bagauden and their leader Tibatto, the Bagaudae (and Tibatto) were not simply bush robbers, but an organized revolutionary movement of the lower classes that strove for an alternative form of society outside the Roman tax system.

== Primary sources ==
- Gallic Chronicle of 452
- Constantius of Lyon, Vita Sancti Germani
- Salvianus, The Gubernatione Dei

== Bibliography ==
- Thompson, E. A. (November 1956). "The Settlement of the Barbarians in Southern Gaul". Journal of Roman Studies. 46 (1–2): 65–75. doi:10.2307/297966.
- Lambert, David (13 September 2013). "Salvian and the Bacaudae". Gallien in Spätantike und Frühmittelalter. De Gruyter. pp. 255–276. doi:10.1515/9783110260779.255. ISBN 9783110260779.
