= 435 =

435 in various calendars
Gregorian calendar	435; CDXXXV
Ab urbe condita	1188
Assyrian calendar	5185
Balinese saka calendar	356–357
Bengali calendar	−159 – −158
Berber calendar	1385
Buddhist calendar	979
Burmese calendar	−203
Byzantine calendar	5943–5944
Chinese calendar	甲戌年 (Wood Dog); 3132 or 2925 — to — 乙亥年 (Wood Pig); 3133 or 2926
Coptic calendar	151–152
Discordian calendar	1601
Ethiopian calendar	427–428
Hebrew calendar	4195–4196
- Hindu calendars
Vikram Samvat	491–492
Shaka Samvat	356–357
Kali Yuga	3535–3536
Holocene calendar	10435
Iranian calendar	187 BP – 186 BP
Islamic calendar	193 BH – 192 BH
Javanese calendar	319–320
Julian calendar	435; CDXXXV
Korean calendar	2768
Minguo calendar	1477 before ROC 民前1477年
Nanakshahi calendar	−1033
Seleucid era	746/747 AG
Thai solar calendar	977–978
Tibetan calendar	ཤིང་ཕོ་ཁྱི་ལོ་ (male Wood-Dog); 561 or 180 or −592 — to — ཤིང་མོ་ཕག་ལོ་ (female Wood-Boar); 562 or 181 or −591

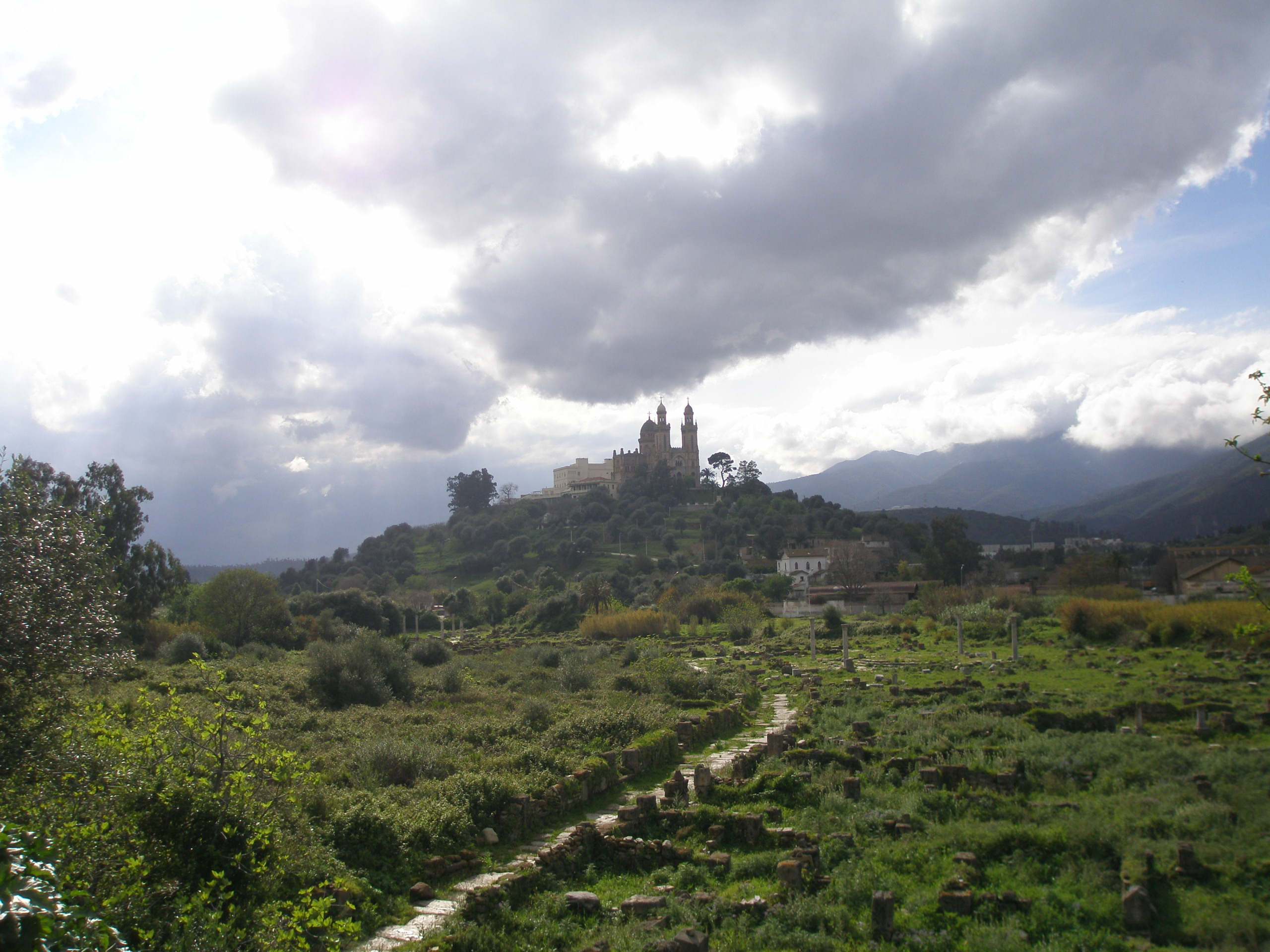
Hippo Regius today Annaba (Algeria)

Year 435 (CDXXXV) was a common year starting on Tuesday of the Julian calendar. At the time, it was known in Rome as the Year of the Consulship of Theodosius and Valentinianus (or, less frequently, year 1188 Ab urbe condita). The denomination 435 for this year has been used since the early medieval period, when the Anno Domini calendar era became the prevalent method in Europe for naming years.

== Events ==
=== By place ===
==== Roman Empire ====
- Second revolt of Bagaudae in Armorica under leading of Tibatto.
- Roman general (magister militum) Flavius Aetius begins a campaign in Gaul against the Burgundians, following their raids into neighbouring Gallia Belgica by King Gunther.
- November 14 – Emperor Theodosius II orders a new edict for the death penalty of all heretics and pagans in the Empire. Judaism is considered a legal non-Christian religion.

==== Africa ====
- King Genseric concludes a peace treaty with the Romans, under which the Vandals retain Mauretania and a part of Numidia as foederati (allies under a special treaty) of Rome.
- The Vandals use Hippo Regius (modern Annaba) as a port for their expeditions. Genseric establishes a merchant fleet to transport goods between Africa and the Italian mainland.
- Huneric, eldest son of Genseric, is sent as a child hostage to the court at Ravenna to secure the alliance with the Western Roman Empire.

==== Central America ====
- August 10 – A figure known to Mayanist scholars as "Casper" begins a 52-year reign in the Mayan city-state of Palenque what is now the state of Chiapas in southern Mexico, and reigns until his death in 487.
- December 8 – On the Mayan calendar, the era of the 9th Baktun begins. There is a change in political alliances just preceding the event when royal personages from the Mexican highland city of Teotihuacan consolidate power individually as Mayan kings.

=== By topic ===
==== Religion ====
- August 3 – Theodosius II exiles Nestorius, archbishop of Constantinople, to a monastery in the Libyan desert at the behest of his sister Pulcheria.
- Ibas is elected bishop of Edessa. He becomes associated with the growth of Nestorianism and openly preaching heretical doctrines in public.

== Deaths ==
- John Cassian, Desert Father and theologian
- Pelagius, British monk (approximate date)
- Philip of Side, Christian church historian (approximate date)
- Rabbula, bishop of Edessa
