= 513 =

Calendar year

513 in various calendars
- Gregorian calendar: 513; DXIII
- Ab urbe condita: 1266
- Assyrian calendar: 5263
- Balinese saka calendar: 434–435
- Bengali calendar: −81 – −80
- Berber calendar: 1463
- Buddhist calendar: 1057
- Burmese calendar: −125
- Byzantine calendar: 6021–6022
- Chinese calendar: 壬辰年 (Water Dragon); 3210 or 3003 — to — 癸巳年 (Water Snake); 3211 or 3004
- Coptic calendar: 229–230
- Discordian calendar: 1679
- Ethiopian calendar: 505–506
- Hebrew calendar: 4273–4274
- Hindu calendars
- Vikram Samvat: 569–570
- Shaka Samvat: 434–435
- Kali Yuga: 3613–3614
- Holocene calendar: 10513
- Iranian calendar: 109 BP – 108 BP
- Islamic calendar: 112 BH – 111 BH
- Javanese calendar: 400–401
- Julian calendar: 513; DXIII
- Korean calendar: 2846
- Minguo calendar: 1399 before ROC 民前1399年
- Nanakshahi calendar: −955
- Seleucid era: 824/825 AG
- Thai solar calendar: 1055–1056
- Tibetan calendar: ཆུ་ཕོ་འབྲུག་ལོ་ (male Water-Dragon); 639 or 258 or −514 — to — ཆུ་མོ་སྦྲུལ་ལོ་ (female Water-Snake); 640 or 259 or −513

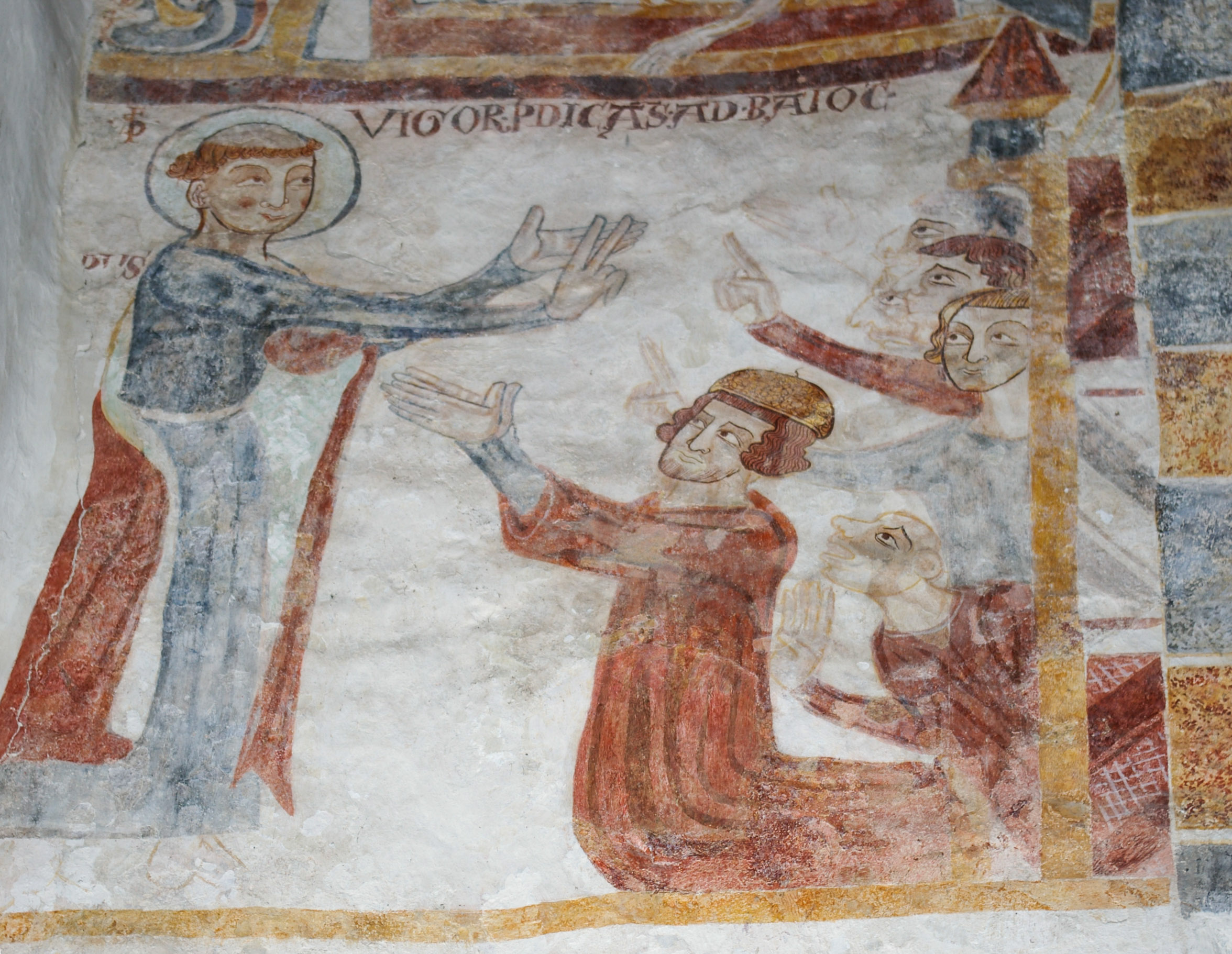
Vigor becomes bishop of Bayeux (6th century)

Year 513 (DXIII) was a common year starting on Tuesday of the Julian calendar. At the time, it was known as the Year of the Consulship of Probus and Clementinus (or, less frequently, year 1266 Ab urbe condita). The denomination 513 for this year has been used since the early medieval period, when the Anno Domini calendar era became the prevalent method in Europe for naming years.

== Events ==
=== By place ===
==== Europe ====
- Revolt of Vitalian: Byzantine general Vitalian revolts against Emperor Anastasius I, and conquers a large part of the Diocese of Thrace. He gains the support of the local people, and assembles an army of 50,000–60,000 men.
- Anastasius I reduces taxes in the provinces of Bithynia and Asia, to prevent them from joining the rebellion. Vitalian marches to Constantinople and encamps at the suburb of Hebdomon (modern Turkey).
- Anastasius I sends an embassy under the former consul Patricius to start negotiations. Vitalian declares his aims: restoration of Chalcedonian Orthodoxy and the settling of the Thracian foederati.
- Vitalian accepts an agreement and returns with his army to Lower Moesia. After a few inconclusive skirmishes, Anastasius I sends a Byzantine army (80,000 men) under his nephew Hypatius.
- Vitalian defeats the Byzantines at Acris (Bulgaria), on the Black Sea coast. He attacks their fortified Laager in darkness, and in a crushing defeat kills a large part of the imperial army.

==== Persia ====
- King Kavadh I adopts the doctrine of the Mazdakites, and breaks the influence of the magnates' (nobility).
- The Jewish community revolts at Ctesiphon against Mazdakism, and establishes an independent Jewish kingdom that lasts for seven years.

=== By topic ===
==== Religion ====
- Vigor becomes bishop of Bayeux. He opposes paganism and founds a monastery later known as Saint-Vigor-le-Grand (Normandy).

== Births ==
- An Ding Wang, emperor of Northern Wei (d. 532)

== Deaths ==
- Gesalec, king of the Visigoths (approximate date)
- Shen Yue, Chinese historian and statesman (b. 441)
