= Amand Vanderhagen =

Flemish clarinetist and teacher

Amand Vanderhagen or Amand Van der Hagen (1753–1822) was a Flemish clarinetist and teacher. He was born in the Austrian Netherlands. He is known for writing Méthode nouvelle et raisonnée pour la clarinette, the earliest extant method book for the Classical clarinet. He is considered a key figure in the development of clarinet pedagogy.
