= Paul Amand Guignebault =

French painter

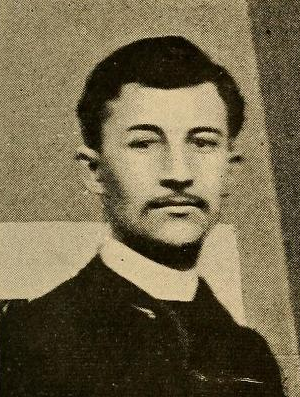
Image of Paul Guignebault

Paul Amand Guignebault (15 April 1871 – 1 April 1931) was a French painter.
