= Amandus Ivanschiz =

Amandus (Matthias Leopold) Ivanschiz (bapt. 24 December 1727 – 1758) was an Austrian composer of the early classical period and a member of the Pauline order. Other spellings of his surname adopted in Slavic musicological literature ("Ivančić" or "Ivančič") are not evidenced in historical accounts. His father came from the village of Baumgarten (presently in the Austrian Burgenland) inhabited by the Croatian minority. Matthias Leopold was baptized on 24 December 1727 in Wiener Neustadt. He entered the Pauline order in his hometown and choose the name of Amandus likely by the end of 1742. After his novitiate in the Ranna monastery at the age of 16 (25 December 1743) he took his monastic vows. He then studied in Maria Trost and Wiener Neustadt, where he was ordained a priest on 15 November 1750. Between 1751 and 1754 he stayed in Rome as an assistant to the Procurator General of the order, from where he returned to Wiener Neustadt. In 1755 he was sent again to the Maria Trost monastery, where he died in 1758, at the young age of 31.

Despite his early passing, Ivanschiz left behind a remarkable number of compositions. His output comprises about 20 symphonies, 15 string trios, 17 masses, 13 litanies, 7 short cantatas (each named "Oratorium"), 9 settings of Marian antiphons, 8 arias and duets to non-liturgical texts, vespers and Te Deum. Some of these works have survived in a few or even a dozen or so copies, which are now found in many, mainly Central European countries, such as Austria, Belgium, Croatia, Czech Republic, Germany, Hungary, Poland, Slovakia, Slovenia, Sweden and Switzerland. It proves that Father Amandus’ music was known to a wide audience and places him among the most popular monk-composers of the 18th century.

Ivanschiz’s oeuvre attracts attention because of its modern musical language, clearly belonging to the early Classical and galant style. Fr. Amandus is one of the first Austrian composers who consistently used a four-movement cycle in his symphonies, a form that can be found in half of his extant works in this genre. He was also one of the first composers who wrote string trios for violin, alto viola and basso (cello), i.e. the characteristic scoring of a mature classical string trio. His instrumental compositions show a gradual development of the typical framework of sonata form.
