= 437 BC =

437 BC in various calendars
Gregorian calendar	437 BC; CDXXXVII BC
Ab urbe condita	317
Ancient Egypt era	XXVII dynasty, 89
Pharaoh	Artaxerxes I of Persia, 29
Ancient Greek Olympiad (summer)	85th Olympiad, year 4
Assyrian calendar	4314
Balinese saka calendar	N/A
Bengali calendar	−1030 – −1029
Berber calendar	514
Buddhist calendar	108
Burmese calendar	−1074
Byzantine calendar	5072–5073
Chinese calendar	癸卯年 (Water Rabbit); 2261 or 2054 — to — 甲辰年 (Wood Dragon); 2262 or 2055
Coptic calendar	−720 – −719
Discordian calendar	730
Ethiopian calendar	−444 – −443
Hebrew calendar	3324–3325
- Hindu calendars
Vikram Samvat	−380 – −379
Shaka Samvat	N/A
Kali Yuga	2664–2665
Holocene calendar	9564
Iranian calendar	1058 BP – 1057 BP
Islamic calendar	1091 BH – 1089 BH
Javanese calendar	N/A
Julian calendar	N/A
Korean calendar	1897
Minguo calendar	2348 before ROC 民前2348年
Nanakshahi calendar	−1904
Thai solar calendar	106–107
Tibetan calendar	ཆུ་མོ་ཡོས་ལོ་ (female Water-Hare) −310 or −691 or −1463 — to — ཤིང་ཕོ་འབྲུག་ལོ་ (male Wood-Dragon) −309 or −690 or −1462

Year 437 BC was a year of the pre-Julian Roman calendar. At the time, it was known as the Year of the Consulship of Macerinus and Fidenas (or, less frequently, year 317 Ab urbe condita). The denomination 437 BC for this year has been used since the early medieval period, when the Anno Domini calendar era became the prevalent method in Europe for naming years.

== Events ==
=== By place ===
==== Greece ====
- Pericles, concerned for Athenian trade with Greek settlements to the East, and in order to counteract a new and possibly threatening Thracian–Scythian alliance, leads Athens' fleet to Pontus on the Black Sea and establishes friendly relations with the Greek cities of the region.

=== By topic ===
==== Architecture ====
- Mnesikles starts to build Propylaia, Acropolis, Athens. The work is canceled in 432 BC, due to the Peloponnesian War, and thus is never finished.
