= Mercatus (bug) =

Scientific classification
- Domain: Eukaryota
- Kingdom: Animalia
- Phylum: Arthropoda
- Class: Insecta
- Order: Hemiptera
- Suborder: Heteroptera
- Family: Pentatomidae
- Subfamily: Phyllocephalinae
- Tribe: Phyllocephalini
- Genus: Mercatus; Distant, 1902

Genus of shield bugs

Mercatus is a genus of shield bugs in the subfamily Phyllocephalinae and the tribe Phyllocephalini, erected by Distant in 1902.
