= Amand, Iran =

Amand or Ammand or Emmend or Amend (Persian: امند) may refer to:

- Amand, East Azerbaijan
- Ammnad, East Azerbaijan
- Amand, North Khorasan
- Amand, Qazvin
