= Gonopsis =

- Gonopsis affinis

Scientific classification
- Kingdom: Animalia
- Phylum: Arthropoda
- Clade: Pancrustacea
- Class: Insecta
- Order: Hemiptera
- Suborder: Heteroptera
- Family: Pentatomidae
- Subfamily: Phyllocephalinae
- Tribe: Phyllocephalini
- Genus: Gonopsis; Amyot & Serville, 1843

Synonyms
- Bessida Walker, 1868

Genus of true bugs

Gonopsis is a genus of mostly Asian shield bugs in the tribe Phyllocephalini, erected by Charles Jean-Baptiste Amyot and Jean Guillaume Audinet-Serville in 1843.

== Species ==
As of September 2026, BioLib.cz: includes:

1. Gonopsis affinis (Uhler, 1860)
2. Gonopsis angularis (Dallas, 1851)
3. Gonopsis bantu Distant, 1900
4. Gonopsis bellatrix Linnavuori, 1975
5. Gonopsis bovilla Distant, 1910
6. Gonopsis catersi Schouteden, 1964
7. Gonopsis coccinea (Walker, 1868)
8. Gonopsis denticulata Amyot & Serville, 1843 -type species
9. Gonopsis dimorphus Linnavuori, 1975
10. Gonopsis diversa (Walker, 1868)
11. Gonopsis erlangeri Schouteden, 1964
12. Gonopsis etiennei Schouteden, 1913
13. Gonopsis gabunensis Schouteden, 1964
14. Gonopsis gillonae Linnavuori, 1974
15. Gonopsis guineensis Jensen-Haarup, 1931
16. Gonopsis hottentotta (Stål, 1853)
17. Gonopsis humeralis Distant, 1910
18. Gonopsis kasaicus Schouteden, 1911
19. Gonopsis lineata Distant, 1910
20. Gonopsis lydenburgi Distant, 1898
21. Gonopsis maura Distant, 1890
22. Gonopsis neavei Distant, 1912
23. Gonopsis pallenscens Distant, 1902
24. Gonopsis recurva Distant, 1903
25. Gonopsis reuteri Schouteden, 1963
26. Gonopsis rubescens Distant, 1887
27. Gonopsis talodicus Linnavuori, 1975
28. Gonopsis tonkinensis Breddin, 1904
29. Gonopsis trilineatus Schouteden, 1910
30. Gonopsis uelensis Schouteden, 1964
G. coccinea (Yunnan)

G. rubescens (India)
