= Amandus (rebel) =

- Usurper or rebel of the Roman Empire
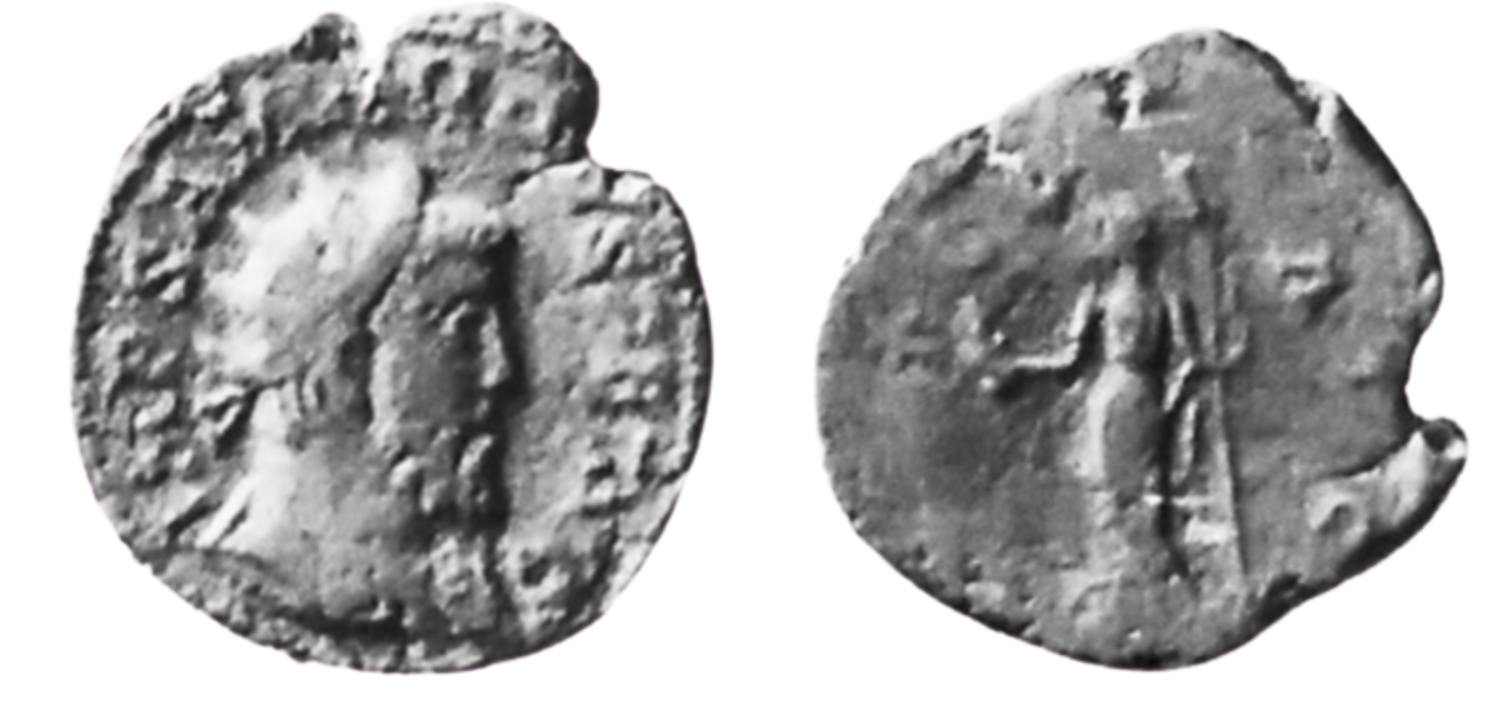
- Debated issue owned by the Ashmolean Museum in Oxford, Percy Webb claims it could be genuine.
- Reign: 285
- With: Aelian
- Died: 285; A citadel near Paris (now Saint-Maur-des-Fossés, France)
Regnal name
- IMP S AMANDVS PF AVG (?)

Amandus was a rebel in Gaul during the reign of Diocletian (reigned 284-305) and leader of the Bagaudae.

He instigated a revolt in Gaul in 285, during the brief power vacuum that followed the death of Carinus. Amandus took charge of a group of peasants ruined by taxes, fugitive slaves, and thieves with the assistance of Aelianus. The two burnt several villages, and ransomed several cities. In response, the emperor Diocletian sent his colleague Maximian. Maximiam weakened their forces in several battles, before forcing them to retreat to a citadel near Paris now known as Saint-Maur-des-Fossés. Maximian successfully destroyed the citadel and killed everyone inside, including Amandus.

Amandus was once thought to be a Roman usurper, with coins issued with his name. However, the only known specimens of this coins might be forgeries.

== See also ==
- Salvia gens
