= 435th (Mixed) Heavy Anti-Aircraft Battery, Royal Artillery =

435th (Mixed) HAA Battery, RA
- Royal Artillery cap badge
- Active: 25 June 1941 – 31 May 1945
- Country: United Kingdom
- Branch: British Army
- Role: Air defence
- Size: Battery
- Part of: 132nd (Mixed) HAA Regiment
- Engagements: Air defence of the UK; Air defence of Brussels

435th (Mixed) Heavy Anti-Aircraft Battery was an air defence unit of Britain's Royal Artillery formed during World War II. It was the first 'Mixed' battery in which women of the Auxiliary Territorial Service were integrated into the unit's personnel and was the forerunner of hundreds of later batteries. It defended the United Kingdom against aerial attack until it deployed to Belgium in January 1945 to defend Brussels against V-1 flying bombs.

== Background ==
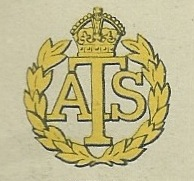
Cap Badge of the Auxiliary Territorial Service

By 1941, after two years of war, Anti-Aircraft Command, tasked with defending the UK against air attack, was suffering a manpower shortage. In April its commander-in-chief, Lieutenant-General Sir Frederick 'Tim' Pile, proposed to overcome this by utilising the women of the Auxiliary Territorial Service (ATS). The ATS was by law a non-combatant service, but it was decided that Defence Regulations permitted the employment of women in anti-aircraft (AA) roles other than actually firing the guns. They worked the radar and plotting instruments, range-finders and predictors, ran command posts and communications, and carried out many other duties. With the increasing automation of heavy AA (HAA) guns, including laying, fuze-setting and loading under remote control from the predictor, the question of who actually fired the gun became blurred as the war progressed. The ATS rank and file, if not always their officers, took to the new role with enthusiasm and 'Mixed' batteries and regiments with the ATS supplying two-thirds of their personnel quickly proved a success.

== Organisation ==
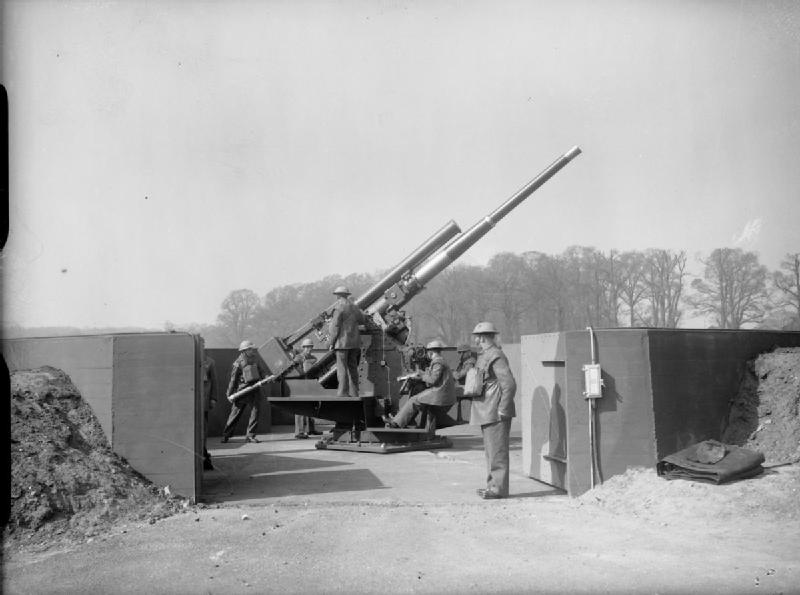
3.7-inch HAA gun site in Richmond Park.

435 Heavy Anti-Aircraft Battery was ordered to form on 21 May 1941 from a cadre of experienced officers and men supplied by 84th (Middlesex, London Transport) Heavy Anti-Aircraft Regiment, Royal Artillery. But this order was rescinded, and a new 435 HAA Bty was formed at Oswestry on 12 June with men transferred from 255, 259 and 260 Light AA Batteries, which had been formed at Carlisle and Saighton on 8 May and then disbanded. The new battery was converted into a Mixed unit (with two-thirds of its personnel supplied by the ATS) on 25 June, and took over an operational gun site in Richmond Park, south-west London, in August.

435 (Mixed) HAA Battery was regimented with 105th HAA Regiment in 26th (London) Anti-Aircraft Brigade, part of 1st Anti-Aircraft Division operating the London Inner Artillery Zone (IAZ) of defences. On 6 October 1941 the battery was transferred within the brigade to join the newly-formed 132nd (Mixed) HAA Regiment.

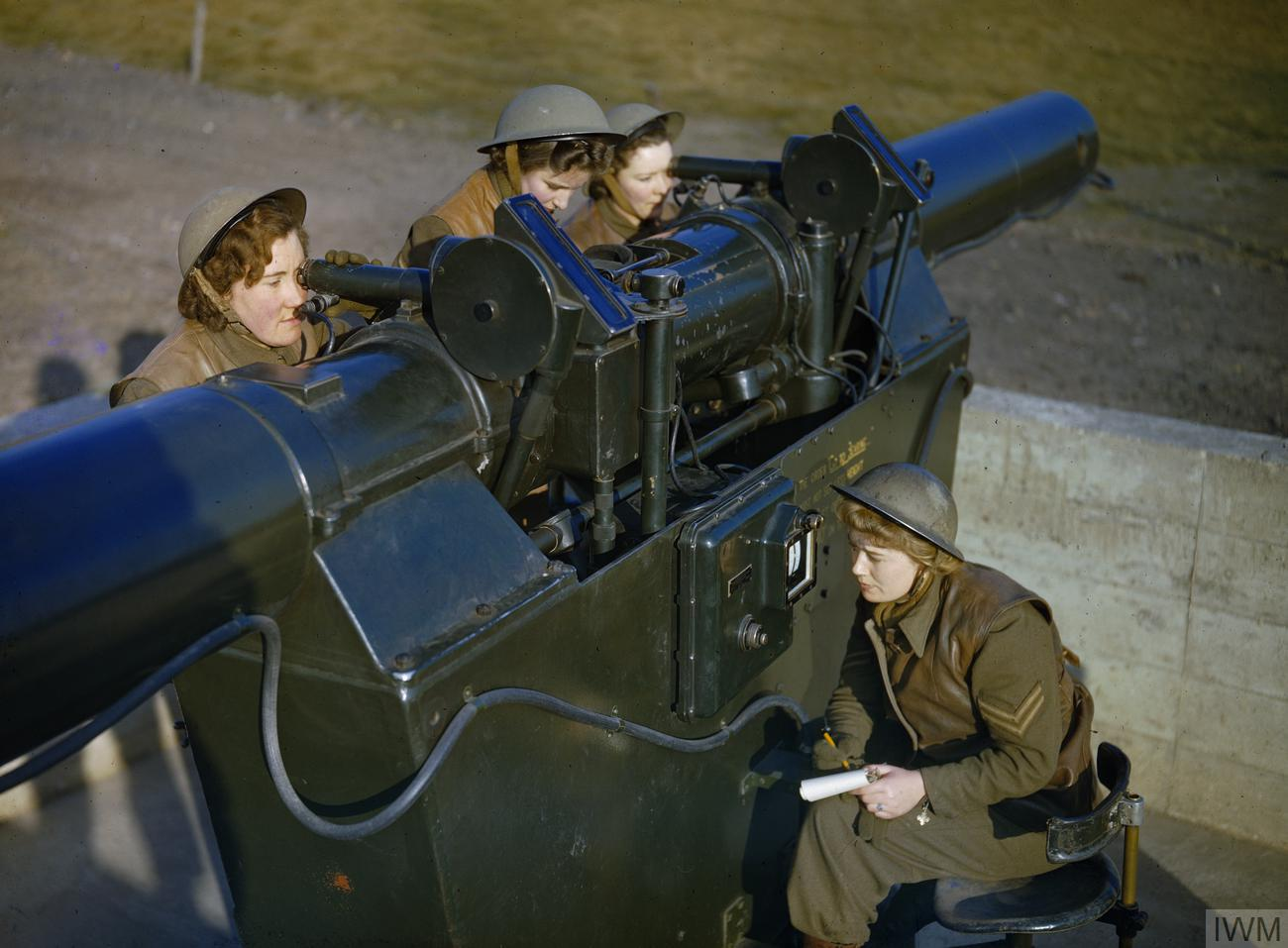
ATS women operating a height and range finder on an HAA gun site, December 1942.

== Deployment ==
The London Blitz had ended in May 1941 and for nearly two years the city was hardly affected by bombing raids apart from a few sporadic attacks during 1943. The Luftwaffe began a new bombing campaign against London in early 1944 (the Baby Blitz). By now the night fighter defences and the London IAZ were well organised and the attackers suffered heavy losses for relatively small results.

== Operation Diver ==
More significant were the V-1 flying bombs, codenamed 'Divers', which began to be launched against London from Northern France soon after the Allies launched their invasion of Normandy (Operation Overlord) on D-Day. V-1s (known to Londoners as 'Doodlebugs') presented AA Command's biggest challenge since the Blitz: the missiles' small size, high speed and awkward height presented a severe problem for AA guns. After two weeks' experience AA Command carried out a major reorganisation, stripping guns from the London IAZ, including 132nd (M) HAA Rgt, and repositioning them along the South Coast to target V-1s coming in over the English Channel, where the gun-laying radar worked best and where a 'downed' V-1 would cause no damage. The whole process involved moving hundreds of guns and vehicles and thousands of servicemen and women, but a new 8-gun HAA battery site could be established in 48 hours. After moving the mobile 3.7-inch HAA guns to the coast, these were progressively replaced by the static Mark IIC model, which had power traverse, accompanied by the most sophisticated Radar No 3 Mark V (the SCR-584 radar set) and No 10 Predictor (the all-electric Bell Labs AAA Computer). The guns were constantly in action and the success rate of the HAA batteries against 'Divers' rose progressively until late summer, when the launching sites in Normandy were overrun by 21st Army Group.

== Brussels 'X' deployment ==
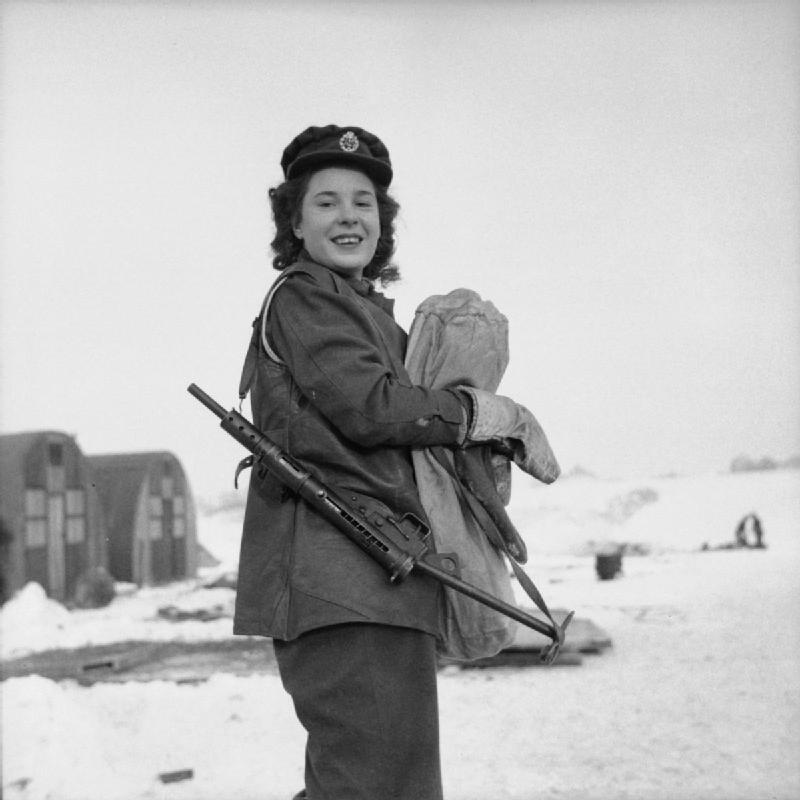
Private Kay Elms, ATS, of a Mixed HAA battery, wearing the white lanyard (and carrying a Sten gun) in Belgium, 26 January 1944.

Once 21st Army Group had captured Brussels and Antwerp, these cities became targets for V-1s launched from within Germany, and anti-Diver or 'X' defences had to be established. AA Command's experience had shown that the power-operated, remotely controlled Mk IIC 3.7-inch gun, with automatic fuze-setting, SCR 584 radar and Predictor No 10 were required to deal with V-1s, but 21st Army Group's mobile HAA units did not have experience with this equipment. 132nd HAA Regiment was the second Mixed unit sent from AA Command to reinforce the Brussels 'X' defences in January 1945. It deployed in bitter winter weather: it was so cold that the oil in the guns' hydraulic power systems froze. The success rate of the Brussels X defences had been low at first, but after the arrival of Mk IIC guns and experienced crews from AA Command the results improved considerably, with best results in February and March 1945. The number of missiles launched at Brussels dropped rapidly as 21st Army continued its advance, and in the last week the AA defences destroyed 97.5 per cent of those reaching the defence belt.

The war in Europe ended on VE Day (8 May 1945) and 435 (Mixed) HAA Battery along with the rest of the regiment was disbanded on 31 May.

== Insignia ==
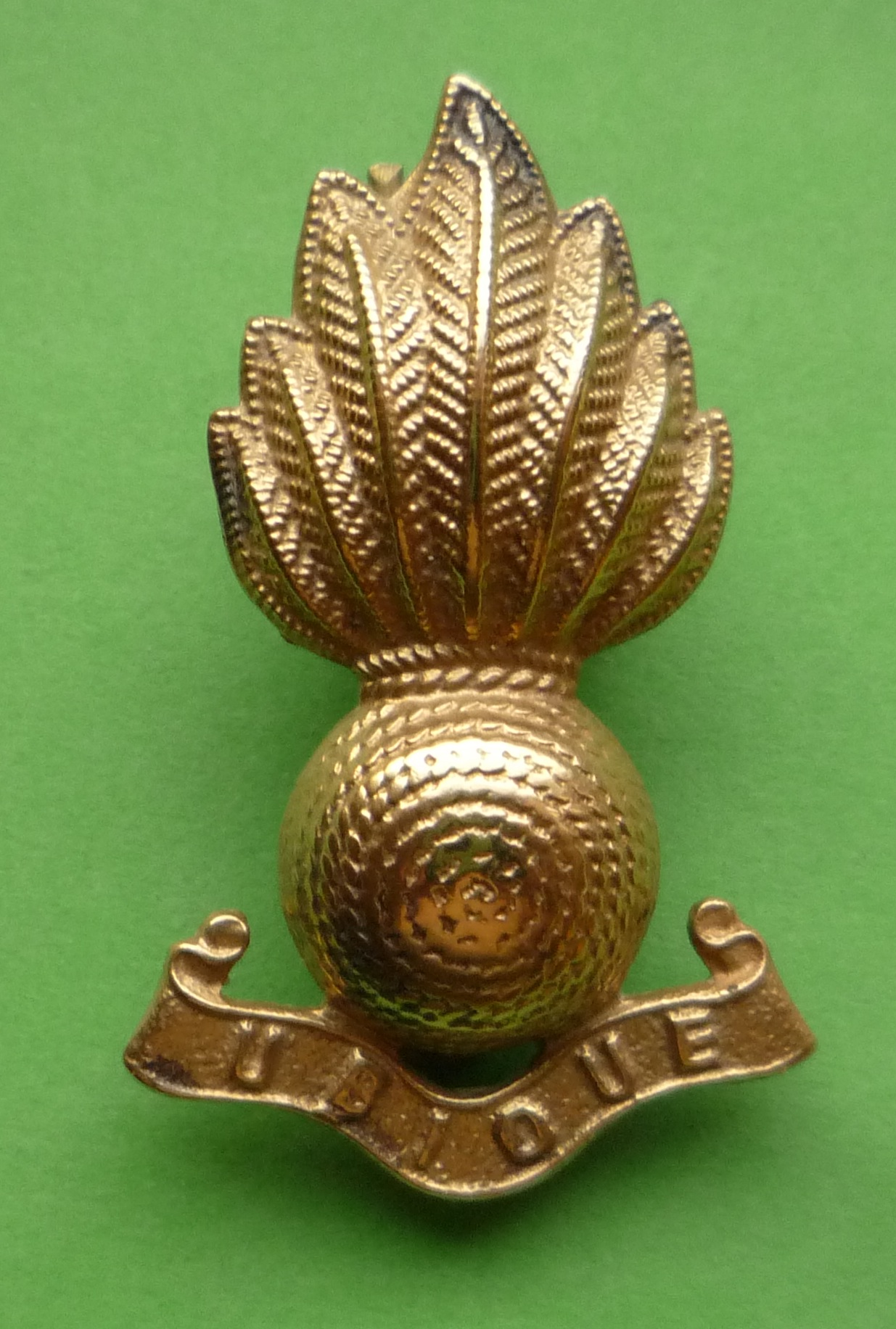
Brass collar badge of the Royal Artillery

While the male members of the battery wore the Royal Artillery's 'gun' cap badge, the women wore the ATS cap badge, but in addition they wore the RA's 'grenade' shoulder badge as a special badge above the left breast pocket of the tunic. Both sexes wore the white RA lanyard on the right shoulder.
