= Bagaudae Revolt =

5th century violent conflict

- Part of the Fall of the Western Roman Empire
- Fragmentation of the Western Empire in 410, shortly after the Bagaudae gained control of northwestern Gaul.
Date	409-417
Location	northwestern Gaul
Result	Roman victory

Belligerents
Bagaudae	Western Roman Empire

Commanders and leaders
	Jovinus; Constantius III; Exuperantius

Strength
Unknown	± 25,000

The Bagaudae Revolt (409-417) was a violent conflict in the early 5th century, involving part of the population in northwestern Gaul. The uprising was an indirect result of the Rhine crossing in 405–406, through which various Germanic peoples invaded the Western Roman Empire, as well as the revolt of the army in Britannia and the resulting civil war. In the following period, the Gallic population largely had to rely on itself and formed self-defense groups, which were called Bagaudae. In mid-409, groups of Bagaudae in the Loire Valley and Brittany rebelled against the Roman regime. The course of this uprising has been briefly reported. Most of the information comes from the work of the Byzantine historian Zosimus (460-515), the Roman poet Rutilius Namatianus (early 5th century), and the priest Salvianus (400-475) from Marseille.

== Background ==
On New Year's Eve 405/406, a coalition of Danube tribes comprising Alans, Vandals (Asdingen and Silingen) and Suevi broke through the defenses on the Rhine border and invaded the Gallic provinces. The Roman field army was not prepared for this, because part of the Gallic army was in Italy, where the Romans at that time had to fight heavily against the Goths in the war of Radagaisus. In many areas the invaders had free rein and the countryside was burned. The invaders also tried to conquer some of the most important cities.

About the same time, or in consequence of conditions on the Continent, the army in Britannia revolted, across the Channel, and appointed a series of usurpers emperor, the last of whom was Constantine III. Constantine went to Gaul with most of the British garrison and stabilized the situation there by fighting and diplomacy, binding the mass of Vandals, Alans and Suebi in northern Gaul. Eventually he established his power over Gaul and Hispania (modern Spain and Portugal), making Arles his capital.

It took a long time for the Roman authorities in Ravenna to respond to the events. Finally, in 408, Emperor Honorius sent an army led by Sarus into Gaul and a struggle for power broke out. As a result of this civil war, the invaders were once again given free rein.

== The revolt ==
Constantine's army managed to repel Sarus's attack and the usurper reached the height of his power in early 409. He controlled the entire Gallic prefecture and Honorius agreed to recognize him as co-emperor and appoint him honorary consul. Nevertheless, he neglected the hinterland because he did not put an end to the problem of the invaders.

=== Commencement ===
The population in Gallia Lugdunensis, the province where a large part of the invading peoples had settled, suffered enormously from all the hostilities. They were forced to feed the invaders and hand over their supplies without any intervention from Constantine, whom they nonetheless had to support with taxes.

Encouraged by the example of the British who had expelled the Saxons themselves, the local population decided to expel the invaders on their own. They form armed groups to protect themselves. In traditions they are called Bagaudae, a name that was also given in previous centuries to groups of farmers and townspeople who had lost everything because of the raids and supported themselves by robbing and plundering.

The armed militias of the Bagauds stopped food supplies to the Barbarian tribes and repelled their attacks. By mid-409, resistance had become so great that the Germanic tribes were chased away and abandoned their settlements. They sought refuge in Hispania with the intention of plundering and settling there. In the same way the Roman magistrates and officers were expelled. The Bagauda groups managed to dominate an area that included Aquitania Segunda, Lugdunensis secunda, Lugdunensis III, and Lugdunensis IV. Constantine III saw no chance to act against this, because his general Gerontius revolted against him in Spain.

=== Resumption of civil war and usurpation of Jovinus ===
In 411, the civil war flared up again when Emperor Honorius ordered his commander-in-chief Constantius to march against Constantine. In September 411 Constantius closed Constantine in with his army near Arles and managed to defeat him. Nevertheless, Constantius could not continue his campaign and had to return to Italy because the capital Ravenna was threatened by the Goths of Alaric I. As a result, the Bagaudian revolt continued, while the Gallic elite – consisting of the senatorial class – also refused to conform to the authority of the government in Ravenna. With the support of the Gallic elite, a new usurper emerged: Jovinus. Lacking sufficient military resources, Jovinus turned to the Germanic foederati on the Rhine for help. His Gallic rule concentrated mainly on the Rhône valley, without intervening against the rebellious Bagaudae in northern Gaul. His usurpation lasted a total of two years and during that period the Bagaudae were the dominant party there.

The end of Jovinus's usurpation did not mean an end to the rebellion. Honorius's army was still at war with the Goths who controlled the area around Narbonne in southern Gaul. Despite this, the Bagaudae failed to organize themselves politically or even form any kind of group identity to give more strength to their demands. Only in case of danger they joined into larger groups. Ultimately, Constantius concluded a peace treaty with the Goths in 416, in which they agreed that the Goths would be given their own settlement area in exchange for military services.

=== Restoration of authority in Gaul ===
The peace with the Visigoths in 416 and the suppression of the usurpations in Gaul and Spain made it possible for the government in Ravenna to restore its authority in the rebellious province from that moment on. The order for this was given to Exuperantius, who conducted a successful campaign and succeeded in restoring imperial authority. The Goths may also have played a role in putting down the rebellion. The southern part of Gaul – Aquitaine, together with the Garonne valley – was assigned to the Visigoths as a settlement area in 418. Despite the pacification of the Bagaudae, these groups would still make themselves heard regularly afterwards.

== Sources ==
=== Primary sources ===
- Zosimus, Byzantium writer
- Rutilius Namatianus, Roman writer
- Salvianus, priest

=== Modern sources ===
- Thompson, E. A. (1982) Romans and Barbarians, Madison WI: University of Wisconsin Press
- Kulikowski, Michael (2000). "Barbarians in Gaul, Usurpers in Britain". Britannia. 31.
- Michael Kulikowski (2004), Late Roman Spain and Its Cities, Baltimore: Johns Hopkins University Press
- Drinkwater, John F. (1998). "The usurpers Constantine III (407–411) and Jovinus (411–413)". Britannia. 29.
- Heather, Peter (2005). The Fall of the Roman Empire: A New History of Rome and the Barbarians (2nd ed.). New York: Oxford University Press. ISBN 0-19-515954-3.
- MacDowall, Simon (2016). The Vandals. Pen & Sword Books Ltd.
- Scharf, Ralf (1993). "Iovinus – Kaiser in Galien". Francia. Forschungen zur westeuropäischen Geschichte (in German) (20/1). Institut historique allemand.
