= Aelian (rebel) =

3rd-century Gallic rebel

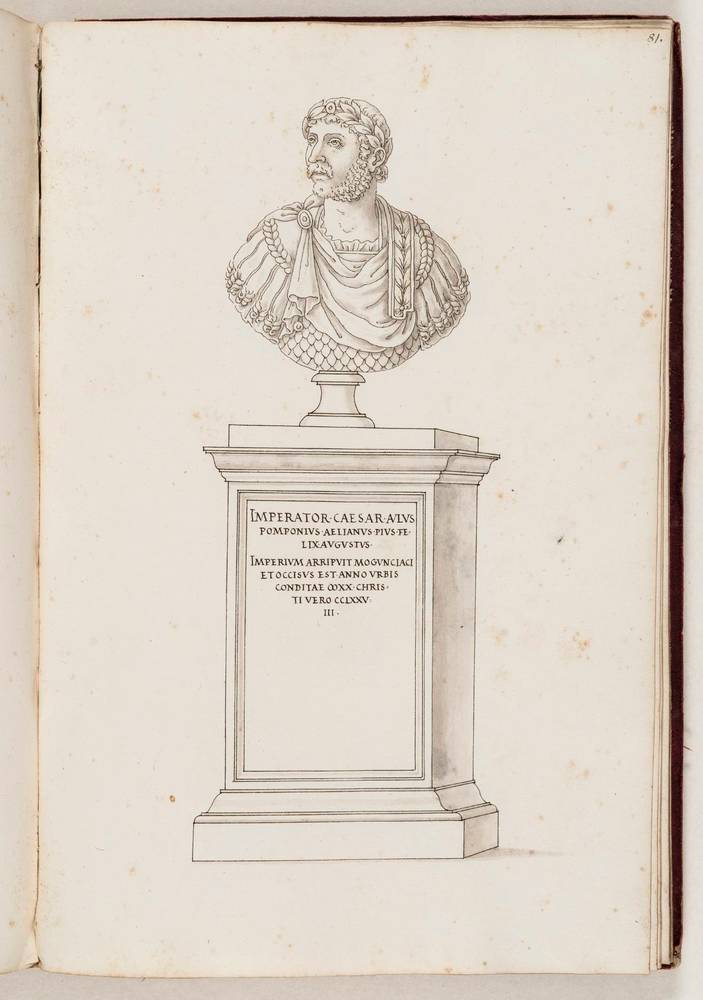
- Engraving by Jacopo Strada
- Occupation: Rebel
- Known for: Leader of an insurrection of Gallic peasants

Aelianus or Aelian was together with Amandus the leader of an insurrection of Gallic peasants, called Bagaudae, in the reign of Diocletian. It was put down by the Caesar Maximianus Herculius in 285. The rebellion he led with Amandus in 285 was attributed by some to Christianity, but Edward Gibbon doubts this in The Decline and Fall of the Roman Empire.
