= Salvianus =

Scientific classification
- Kingdom: Animalia
- Phylum: Arthropoda
- Clade: Pancrustacea
- Class: Insecta
- Order: Hemiptera
- Suborder: Heteroptera
- Family: Pentatomidae
- Subfamily: Phyllocephalinae
- Tribe: Phyllocephalini
- Genus: Salvianus; Distant, 1902

Genus of insects

Salvianus is a genus of Asian shield bugs in the subfamily Phyllocephalinae and the tribe Phyllocephalini, erected by English entomologist William Lucas Distant, in 1902.

== Species ==
As of September 2026, the genus contains the single species: Salvianus lunatus (Distant, 1901) that Distant had originally placed in the similar genus Gonopsis.
