= Chronica Gallica of 452 =

The Chronica Gallica of 452, also called the Gallic Chronicle of 452, Chronicon imperiale, Chronicon Pithoeanum, is a Latin chronicle of Late Antiquity, presented in the form of annals, which continues that of Jerome. It was edited by Theodor Mommsen in the Monumenta Germaniae Historica as Chronica Gallica A. CCCCLII, along with another anonymous Gallic chronicle, the Chronica Gallica of 511.

The chronicle begins in 379 with the elevation of Theodosius I as co-emperor, and ends with the attack of Attila, king of the Huns, on Italy in 452. The contents focus on Gaul, the emperors and the popes, while events in the eastern part of the empire find little mention. It is the oldest preserved historical work from Gaul. The place of origin is controversial, but most likely somewhere in the Rhône Valley or, as some suggest, specifically Marseille.

The Chronica Gallica of 511, edited in the same MGH volume, also begins with Theodosius, but covers the period up to 511.

== Sources ==
- MGH Auctores antiquissimi 9: Chronica minora saec. IV. V. VI. VII. (I). ed. Theodor Mommsen. Berlin: Weidmann, 1892, pp. 615–666, Digitalised. (Text: p. 646ff. and each second page [648, 650 etc.])
- Richard Burgess: "The Gallic Chronicle of 452: A New Critical Edition with a Brief Introduction". In: Ralph W. Mathisen and Danuta Shanzer (eds.): Society and Culture in Late Antique Gaul: Revisiting the Sources. Aldershot: Ashgate, 2001, p. 52ff.
- Steven Muhlberger. "The Gallic Chronicle of 452 and Its Authority for British Events". Britannia 14 (1983), pp. 23-33.
- Steven Muhlberger: The Fifth-Century Chroniclers: Prosper, Hydatius, and the Gallic Chronicler of 452. Leeds: Francis Cairns, 1990.
- Jan-Markus Kötter, Carlo Scardino (eds.): Gallische Chroniken (= Kleine und fragmentarische Historiker der Spätantike G 7–8). Schöningh: Paderborn, 2016, ISBN 978-3-506-78489-6.
