= Bagaudae =

Groups of peasant insurgents in the later Roman Empire

Bagaudae (also spelled plu. bacaudae or bacauda singular) were groups of peasant insurgents in the western parts of the later Roman Empire, who arose during the Crisis of the Third Century and persisted until the very end of the Western Empire, particularly in the less-Romanised areas of Gallia and Hispania. They were affected by the depredations of the late Roman state, wealthy landowners, and clerics.

The invasions, military anarchy, and disorders of the third century provided a chaotic and ongoing degradation of the regional power structure within a declining Empire. During the chaos, the bagaudae achieved some temporary and scattered successes under the leadership of members of the underclass as well as former members of local ruling elites.

== Etymology ==
The name probably means 'fighters' in Gaulish. C. E. V. Nixon assesses the bagaudae, from the official Imperial viewpoint, as "bands of brigands who roamed the countryside looting and pillaging".

In the sister language of Brythons said to be similar to Gaulish by Roman writers, Bacauda mirrors aspects of the Middle Welsh 'Brwydr', 'to fight', particularly in pronunciation. From Proto-Brythonic *bruɨdr, from Proto-Celtic *breitrā (“word”), also "battle," perhaps related to *brē-, *bri- (“to cut”), from Proto-Indo-European *bʰerH- (“to strike”); compare Old Irish bríathar (“word”).[1]

J. C. S. Léon interprets the most completely assembled documentation and identifies the bagaudae as impoverished local free peasants, reinforced by brigands, runaway slaves and deserters from the legions, who were trying to resist the ruthless labor exploitation of the late Roman proto-feudal colonus manorial and military systems, and all manner of punitive laws and levies in the marginal areas of the Empire.

== Suppression ==
After the bagaudae came to the full attention of the central authorities around 284 AD, the re-establishment of the settled social order was swift and severe: the peasant insurgents were crushed in 286 AD by the co-Caesar Maximian and his subordinate Carausius under the aegis of the Augustus Diocletian. Their leaders are mentioned as Amandus and Aelianus, although E.M. Wightman, in her Gallia Belgica proposes that the two belonged to the local Gallo-Roman landowning class who then became "tyrants" and most likely rebelled against the grinding taxation and garnishing of their lands, harvests, and manpower by the predatory agents of the late Roman state (see frumentarii, publicani).

The Panegyric of Maximian, dating to 289 AD and attributed to Claudius Mamertinus, relates that during the bagaudae uprisings of 284–285 AD in the districts around Lugdunum (Lyon), "simple farmers sought military garb; the plowman imitated the infantryman, the shepherd the cavalryman, the rustic harvester of his own crops the barbarian enemy". In fact they shared several similar characteristics with the Germanic Heruli people. Mamertinus also called them "two-shaped monsters" (monstrorum biformium), emphasising that while they were technically Imperial farmers and citizens, they were also marauding rogues who had become foes to the Empire.

== Recurrences ==
The phenomenon recurred in the mid-fourth century in the reign of Constantius, in conjunction with an invasion of the Alemanni. Although Imperial control was re-established by the Frankish general Silvanus, his subsequent betrayal by court rivals forced him into rebellion and his work was undone. In around 360 AD the historian Aurelius Victor is the sole writer to note the attacks of bagaudae in the peripheries of the larger towns and walled cities.

In the fifth century Bagaudae are noted initially in the Loire valley and Brittany, circa 409–417 AD, fighting various armies sent against them by the last seriously effective Western Roman general, Flavius Aëtius. Aetius used federates such as the Alans under their king Goar to try to suppress a Bacaudic revolt in Armorica. St Germanus got mercy for the Bagaudae but they later revolted again under a leader called Tibatto. They are also mentioned around the same time in the province of Macedonia, the only time they emerge in the Eastern Empire, which may be connected with economic hardships under Arcadius.

By the middle of the fifth century they started to appear in Hispania too, and are mentioned in control of parts of central Gaul and the Ebro valley. In Hispania, the king of the Suevi, Rechiar (died 456 AD), took up as allies the local bagaudae in ravaging the remaining Roman municipia, a unique alliance between Germanic ruler and rebel peasant.

That the depredations of the ruling classes were mostly responsible for the uprising of the bagaudae was not lost on the fifth-century writer of historicised polemic Salvian; setting himself in the treatise De gubernatione Dei the task of proving God's constant guidance, he declares in book III that the misery of the Roman world is all due to the neglect of God's commandments and the terrible sins of every class of society. It is not merely that slaves and servants are thieves and runaways, wine-bibbers and gluttons – the rich are much worse (IV, 3); it is their harshness and greed that drive the poor to join the bagaudae and flee for shelter to the barbarian invaders (V, 5 and 6).

== Reputation ==
The reputation of the bagaudae has varied with the uses made of them in historicised narratives of the Late Roman Empire and the Middle Ages. There has been some speculation that theirs was a Christian revolt, but the sparsity of information in the texts gives that little substance although there may well have been many Christians among them. In general, they seem to have been equal parts of brigands and insurgents.

In the second half of the 19th century, interest in the bagaudae revived, resonating with contemporary social unrest. The French historian Jean Trithemié was famous for a nationalist view of the "Bagaudae" by arguing that they were an expression of national identity among the Gallic peasants, who sought to overthrow oppressive Roman rule and realize the eternal "French" values of liberty, equality and brotherhood.

E. A. Thompson in Past and Present (1952) portrayed this rural discontent within the context of Marxist class warfare.

== See also ==
- Bagaudae Revolt
- Second Bagaudae Revolt
- Eudoxius
- Jacquerie
- List of peasant revolts
- Popular revolt in late medieval Europe
- Plebeians
