= E. A. Thompson =

Irish-born British historian (1914–1994)

E. A. Thompson FBA
- Born: Edward Arthur Thompson; 22 May 1914; Waterford, Ireland
- Died: 1 January 1994 (aged 79); Nottingham, England
- Spouses: Thelma Phelps (m. 1945; div. 1958); Hazel Casken (m. 1964)

Academic background
- Education: Trinity College, Dublin
- Academic advisor: H. W. Parker

Academic work
- Discipline: Classics; history; medieval studies
- Institutions: Trinity College, Dublin; University of Swansea; King's College, London; University of Nottingham
- Main interests: Late antiquity; early Germanic peoples
- Influenced: Neil Christie; Peter Heather; Malcolm Todd

Edward Arthur Thompson FBA (22 May 1914 – 1 January 1994) was an Irish-born British Marxist historian of classics and medieval studies. He was professor and director of the classics department at the University of Nottingham from 1948 to 1979, and a fellow of the British Academy. Thompson was a pioneer in the study of late antiquity, and was for decades the most prominent British scholar in this field. He was particularly interested in the relations between Ancient Rome and "barbarian" peoples such as the Huns and Visigoths, and has been credited with revitalising English-language scholarship on the history of early Germanic peoples. EA Thompson's works on these subjects have been highly influential.

== Early life ==
Edward Arthur Thompson was born on 22 May 1914 in the town of Waterford, Ireland, to a strictly Presbyterian family. His father, Robert James Thompson, who was of Irish descent, was the son of a weaver and worked for the National Health Insurance. His mother, Margaret Murison, was of Scottish descent. Her parents had settled in Ireland when her father became the manager of the estate of the Earl of Ormond in County Kilkenny. Thompson's family moved to Dublin in 1922. Having graduated from The High School, Dublin, Thompson entered Trinity College, Dublin, with a sizarship, a distinction he shared with Jonathan Swift. He was the first of his family to enter university. His father had probably intended for him to become a Presbyterian minister, but Thompson would come to reject the religious puritanism of his family. Thompson graduated with first-class honours in classics from Trinity College in 1936, later attributing his selection of the classics as a discipline to the choice of his headmaster at The High School. His BLitt on the Arcadian League was supervised by H. W. Parker.

From 1937 to 1938, Thompson was an exchange student in Berlin. While in Germany, being a communist himself, Thompson developed an intense dislike for Nazism. He claimed to have witnessed the smashing of a jeweler's shop and the beating of its proprietor by a Nazi mob. He said that these experiences had a major influence on his future cautious approach to the study of Germanic peoples, which was to characterize his approach to this subject.

== Early career ==
Thompson was appointed a lecturer in classics at Trinity College, Dublin, in 1939. Although initially appointed for one year, Thompson's contract was renewed, and he stayed on (though at a reduced salary) until 1941.

Already prepared to enter the Second World War with an enlistment in the British Army, Thompson secured an appointment at the University of Swansea in 1941 through the help of his friend Benjamin Farrington. From Swansea, Thompson transferred to King's College, London, teaching as a classics lecturer from 1945 to 1948. At Swansea, Thompson became a close friend of fellow historian Norman H. Baynes. His first book, Ammianus Marcellinus (1947), played a major role in reviving the study of late antiquity in the United Kingdom. His next book, A History of Attila and the Huns (1948), was inspired by his work on Ammianus Marcellinus. Both of these works were later reprinted and remained standard works on the subject for several decades. From the late 1940s, Thompson dedicated all his scholarly interest towards to late antiquity.

== Career at the University of Nottingham ==
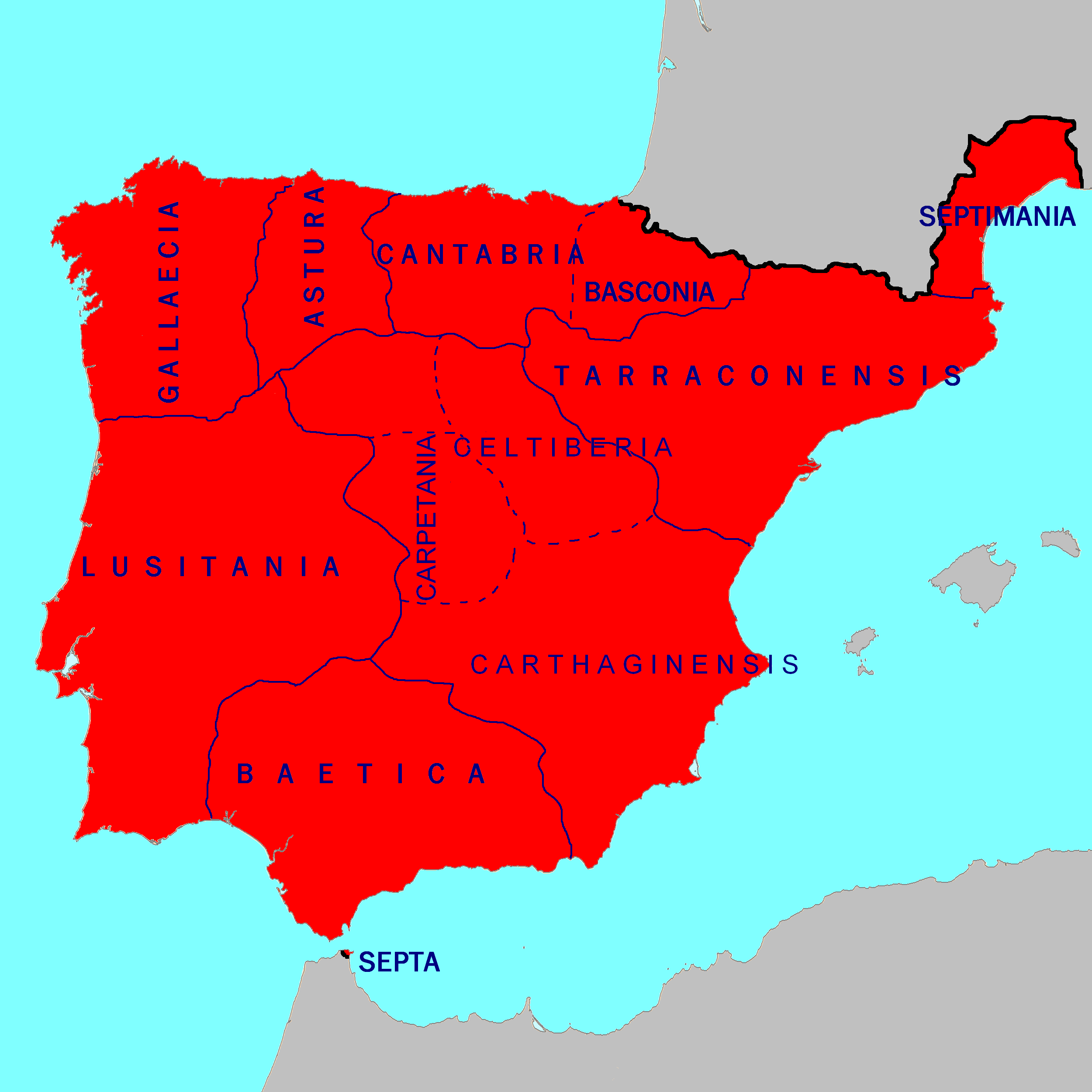
Extent of the Visigothic Kingdom (AD 700), which was the subject of numerous studies by Thompson

Thompson moved again in 1948 – this time to direct the classics department at the University of Nottingham, where he worked from 1948 to 1979. During this time, Thompson was along with A. H. M. Jones a major figure in reviving the study of late antiquity in the United Kingdom. He was considered the leading scholar in the United Kingdom in the field, with the University of Nottinhgham emerging as one of its principal centers of study. At Nottingham, Thompson focused mainly on research and teaching rather than administrative work. Distinguished members of his department at this time included Harold Mattingly, W. Charlmers, G. R. Watson, Mollie Whittaker, A. H. Sommerstein and J. W. Rich.

In 1951, perhaps inspired by Farrington, Thompson published the book A Roman Reformer and Inventor, which examined the anonymous author of the De rebus bellicis. Thompson's book helped build the foundations for modern studies on this work.

By the early 1950s, Thompson's research was increasingly focused on the early Germanic peoples. At this time, very little research had been carried out in this field in the English-speaking world. Thompson sought to approach the subject without ideological ballast. Nevertheless, his revulsion towards Nazism probably influenced his research of this field. His works were pioneering in the field of Germanic studies, in which he was the leading scholar of his generation. He helped detach the field from the ideological bias which had characterized it in the past.

Thompson published his work The Early Germans in 1965, which was largely concerned with the changing structure of Germanic society through its encounter with Roman Empire. He attributed increasing social stratification among the Germanic peoples of the early centuries AD to the influence of the Roman Empire. He was particularly interested in the Christianisation of the Germanic peoples, and the differences between Germanic peoples who converted to Arianism and Roman Catholicism. His next major studies, The Visigoths in the Time of Ulfila (1965) and The Goths in Spain (1969), centered on the Visigoths. His works on early Germanic peoples, particularly those on the Visigoths, quickly became standard reference works on the subject, and were still considered unsurpassed at the time of his death. Thompson's studies on the Visigoths particularly examined the relations between various classes of Visigothic society with the Roman population among whom they lived. He maintained that while the Visigothic elite sought to adapt to and further develop Roman society, the Visigothic rank-and-file sought to overthrow it altogether. Thompson's reliance on literary evidence and aim to present a coherent account of history, distinguished him from many more recent historians, who are heavily influenced by critical theory and consider primary sources unreliable. Thompson was not afraid of controversy, and his criticism of others' views could be hard-hitting.

Edward Thompson ... was the leading scholar of his generation on the history of the Germanic migrations ... His academic achievement was to apply modern historical analysis to the study of the Germanic tribes, escaping the influence of 19th-century romantic myths ...

— The Guardian

Until his retirement in 1979, Thompson served as the first Chairman of the Editorial Board of the scholarly journal Nottingham Medieval Studies, founded by Lewis Thorpe in 1957. Under Thompson's leadership, it rapidly emerged a major journal in its field. Thompson was elected a Fellow of the British Academy in 1964 – the first University of Nottingham academic to be so honoured. On the death of A. H. M. Jones in 1970, Thompson was made Chairman of the academy's committee supervising the Prosopography of the Later Roman Empire project.

== Later life ==
Thompson retired from the University of Nottingham in 1979. After his retirement Thompson spent a year at the University of Wisconsin, during which he produced four major papers which were later printed in the collection Romans and Barbarians: The Decline of the Western Empire (1982). Thompson subsequently shifted his focus to the end of Roman Britain, on which he published the monographs Saint Germanus of Auxerre and the End of Roman Britain (1984) and Who Was Saint Patrick? (1985). In his studies of post-Roman Britain, Thompson argued that literary evidence implied that the Anglo-Saxon settlement of Britain was characterized by discontinuity and widespread upheaval. By the 1980s, this interpretation had fallen somewhat out of fashion, particularly among archaeologists. Thompson died in Nottingham on 1 January 1994.

== Politics ==
Thompson's revulsion towards Nazism, and his rejection of the strict Presbyterianism of his family, made him receptive towards Marxist ideology, which was popular among intellectuals in the 1930s. He was particularly impressed by the works of Friedrich Engels and Vladimir Lenin. Influenced by Benjamin Farrington and the poet Roger Roughton, Thompson joined the Communist Party of Great Britain by 1941. The influence of Marxism is present in Thompson's works on a wide variety of subjects. This influence is particularly detectable in his studies on the rebellions of the Bagaudae.

Thompson left the Communist Party of Great Britain in 1956, the year of the Soviet Union's intervention in Hungary. In later life he referred to himself as a Thompsonist rather than a Marxist. His academic work continued to demonstrate a Marxist-oriented outlook on history. The class structure of societies continued to play a central role in his studies. No longer playing an active part in politics, he maintained an enthusiastic interest. He was strongly opposed to the Soviet handling of the Prague Spring, and criticised both British policy and sectarian violence in Northern Ireland.

== Personal life ==
While lecturing at King's College Thompson met his first wife Thelma Marjorie Phelps, a physician, whom he married in 1945. They had a son and a daughter, but separated in 1958. In 1964 he married Hazel Joyce Casken, with whom he had a daughter and lived until his death.

== Works ==
- The Historical Work of Ammianus Marcellinus. Cambridge University Press. 1947.
- A History of Attila and the Huns. Clarendon Press. 1948. ISBN 9780837176406.
- A Roman Reformer and Inventor: Being a New Text of the Treatise De Rebus Bellicis. Clarendon Press. 1952.
- The Early Germans. Clarendon Press. 1965. ISBN 9780198142522.
- The Visigoths in the Time of Ulfila. Clarendon Press. 1966. ISBN 978-0-19-814254-6.
- The Goths in Spain. Clarendon Press. 1969. ISBN 9780198142713.
- Romans and Barbarians: The Decline of the Western Empire. University of Wisconsin Press. 1982. ISBN 9780299087005.
- Saint Germanus of Auxerre and the End of Roman Britain. Boydell Press. 1984. ISBN 9780851154053.
- Who Was Saint Patrick?. Boydell & Brewer. 1985. ISBN 9780851157177.

== See also ==
- Herwig Wolfram
