= 430s =

Decade

The 430s decade ran from January 1, 430, to December 31, 439.

== Events ==
=== By place ===
==== Roman Empire ====
- Spring – The Vandals under King Genseric extend their power in North Africa along the Mediterranean Sea, and lay siege to Hippo Regius (where Augustine has recently been bishop).
- Aetius puts an end to the Gothic revolt of Anaolsus, not far from Arles; Anaolsus is taken prisoner.
- April - Aetius defeats the Juthungi during his campaign in the Alps.
- May - Flavius Felix, his wife and a deacon are accused of plotting against Aetius. They are arrested in Ravenna and executed. Aetius is granted the title of patricius (Roman nobility).
- The Huns led by Octar attack the Burgundians, who occupied territory on the Rhine near the city of Worms (Germany). During the fighting Octar dies, and his army is destroyed.

==== Asia ====
- Feng Ba abdicates as emperor of the Northern Yan, one of the states vying for control of China. He is succeeded by his brother Feng Hong.

=== By topic ===
==== Religion ====
- August 28 – Augustine dies during the siege of Hippo Regius at age 75, leaving behind his monumental work The City of God and other works that will have influence on Christianity.
- Saint Patrick reaches Ireland on his missionary expedition (approximate date).
- Peter the Iberian founds a Georgian monastery near Bethlehem.

=== By place ===
==== Roman Empire ====
- Aetius campaign in the Alps: Flavius Aetius, Roman general (magister militum), fights the rebellion in Rhaetia (Switzerland) and Noricum (Austria). He is attested in the city of Vindelicia (modern Augsburg), reestablishing Roman rule on the Danube frontier.
- Aetius pushes the Salian Franks back across the River Somme. King Chlodio signs a peace treaty and becomes a foederatus of the Western Roman Empire.

==== Africa ====
- Hippo Regius becomes the capital of the Vandal Kingdom. After 14 months of hunger and disease, the Vandals ravage the city. Emperor Theodosius II sends an imperial fleet with an army under command of Aspar, and lands at Carthage.
- Aspar is routed by the Vandals and Flavius Marcian, future Byzantine emperor, is captured during the fighting. He negotiates a peace with King Genseric and maintains imperial authority in Carthage.

==== Central America ====
- March 10 – Kʼukʼ Bahlam I, the first known ruler of the Mayan city-state of Palenque (the modern-day state of Chiapas in southern Mexico) comes to power and reigns until his death four years later.
- Possible date of the Tierra Blanca Joven (TBJ) eruption of the Ilopango caldera in central El Salvador.

=== By topic ===
==== Arts and Sciences ====
- Greek Neoplatonist philosopher Proclus begins studying at the Academy in Athens.

==== Religion ====
- June – First Council of Ephesus: Nestorianism is rejected; the Nicene Creed is declared to be complete. Nestorius is deposed from his see.
- October 1 – Maximianus is enthroned as Patriarch of Constantinople.
- Pope Celestine I dispatches Palladius to serve as bishop to the Irish.

=== By place ===
==== Roman Empire ====
- Roman civil war: Roman forces under command of Flavius Aetius are defeated near Rimini (Italy) in battle. His rival comes Bonifacius is mortally wounded and dies several days later. Aetius flees to Dalmatia and seeks refuge with the Huns.
- Sebastianus, son-in-law of Bonifacius, becomes supreme commander (magister militum) of the Western Roman army. Empress Galla Placidia gives him considerable influence over imperial policy.

==== Europe ====
- The Huns are united by King Rugila (also called Rua) on the Hungarian Plain. He exacts annual peace payments from the Eastern Roman Empire.

=== By topic ===
==== Art ====
- The Basilica of Saint Sabina at the Aventine (Rome) is finished by Priest Petrus of Illyria.
- Assembly begins on The Parting of Lot and Abraham, a mosaic in the nave arcade of the Basilica of Santa Maria Maggiore.

==== Religion ====
- July 27 – Pope Celestine I dies after a 10-year reign in which he led a vigorous policy against Nestorianism. He is succeeded by Sixtus III as the 44th pope.
- Saint Patrick, Roman Britain-born missionary, is consecrated a bishop and converts the Irish to Christianity until his death around 460.
- December 25 – Christmas is celebrated for the first time in Alexandria (approximate date).

=== By place ===
==== Roman Empire ====
- Flavius Aetius returns to Italy with the support of the Huns. He gains control over the young emperor Valentinian III, and becomes his "protector".
- Petronius Maximus is appointed consul of the Western Roman Empire.

=== By topic ===
==== Religion ====
- Pope Sixtus III helps to settle a Christological dispute between the patriarchs Cyril of Alexandria and John of Antioch, that has continued since the First Council of Ephesus, two years ago. They sign the "Formula of Reunion", thus ending their conflict over Nestorianism.

=== By place ===
==== Roman Empire ====
- Flavius Aetius, Roman general (magister militum) in the service of Emperor Valentinian III, begins to hold power in Rome (this will continue for 20 years). He allows the Huns to settle in Pannonia, along the Sava River.
- Justa Grata Honoria, older sister of Valentinian, becomes pregnant from an officer in her household. Circles in the court at Ravenna assume inevitably that Honoria is planning to raise her paramour to imperial rank and challenge her brother. Valentinian then has him executed.
- Summer – The Huns under Rugila devastate Thrace and move steadily towards Constantinople. The citizens prepare themselves for a long siege, depending on the strength of the Theodosian Walls.
- Emperor Theodosius II bribes the Huns (after the death of Rugila) to keep the peace in the Eastern Roman Empire.

==== Africa ====
- The Vandals in North Africa defeat the Roman general Aspar and force him to withdraw. He serves as consul at Constantinople.

==== Europe ====
- Attila, king of the Huns, consolidates his power in the Hungarian capital, probably on the site of Buda (modern Budapest). He jointly rules the kingdom with his brother Bleda.

=== By topic ===
==== Religion ====
- April 12 – Maximianus dies on Great and Holy Thursday. He is succeeded by Proclus, who becomes archbishop of Constantinople.

=== By place ===
==== Roman Empire ====
- Second revolt of Bagaudae in Armorica under leading of Tibatto.
- Roman general (magister militum) Flavius Aetius begins a campaign in Gaul against the Burgundians, following their raids into neighbouring Gallia Belgica by King Gunther.
- November 14 – Emperor Theodosius II orders a new edict for the death penalty of all heretics and pagans in the Empire. Judaism is considered a legal non-Christian religion.

==== Africa ====
- King Genseric concludes a peace treaty with the Romans, under which the Vandals retain Mauretania and a part of Numidia as foederati (allies under a special treaty) of Rome.
- The Vandals use Hippo Regius (modern Annaba) as a port for their expeditions. Genseric establishes a merchant fleet to transport goods between Africa and the Italian mainland.
- Huneric, eldest son of Genseric, is sent as a child hostage to the court at Ravenna to secure the alliance with the Western Roman Empire.

==== Central America ====
- August 10 – A figure known to Mayanist scholars as "Casper" begins a 52-year reign in the Mayan city-state of Palenque what is now the state of Chiapas in southern Mexico, and reigns until his death in 487.
- December 8 – On the Mayan calendar, the era of the 9th Baktun begins. There is a change in political alliances just preceding the event when royal personages from the Mexican highland city of Teotihuacan consolidate power individually as Mayan kings.

=== By topic ===
==== Religion ====
- August 3 – Theodosius II exiles Nestorius, archbishop of Constantinople, to a monastery in the Libyan desert at the behest of his sister Pulcheria.
- Ibas is elected bishop of Edessa. He becomes associated with the growth of Nestorianism and openly preaching heretical doctrines in public.

=== By place ===
==== Europe ====
- End of the Burgundian Revolt of Gunther: Flavius Aetius, Roman general (magister militum), attempts to put an end to Burgundian raids in Gaul. He calls in Hun mercenaries under the command of Attila and his brother Bleda, which plunder Augusta Vangionum, killing some 20,000 Burgundians. The Kingdom of the Burgundians is destroyed; King Gunther and his family are killed (this epic disaster will later provide the source for the Nibelungenlied).
- In the Gothic War (436-439) besieges king Theodoric I the city of Narbonne; the Visigoths obtain access to the Mediterranean Sea and the roads to the Pyrenees.

=== By topic ===
==== Religion ====
- The Buddhist Srimala Sutra is translated into Chinese by Gunabhadra.

=== By place ===
==== Europe ====
- Flavius Aetius, Roman general (magister militum) beats Tibatto and ends temporary the uprising of the Baguads. Then he secures the besieged city of Narbonne (Southern Gaul) against King Theodoric I. He concludes a peace treaty with the Visigoths, and becomes consul for the second time.
- July 2 – Valentinian III, age 18, rules as emperor over the Western Roman Empire. His mother Galla Placidia ends her regency, but continues to exercise political influence until her death in 450.
- October 29 – Valentinian III cements an alliance with the eastern emperor, Theodosius II, by marrying his daughter Licinia Eudoxia in Constantinople. This marks the reunion of the two branches of the House of Theodosius.
- Battle of Wallop: Ambrosius Aurelianus, leader of the Romano-British, defeats the Anglo Saxons under King Vortigern. He is given all the kingdoms of the western side of Britain (according to Historia Brittonum).

==== Mesoamerica ====
- K'inich Yax K'uk' Mo' dies after an 11-year reign. He is the founder and first ruler of the pre-Columbian Maya civilization centered at Copán (modern Honduras).

=== By topic ===
==== Religion ====
- A synod at Constantinople attempts to impinge on the Pope's rights in Illyria. Proclus tries to implement the synod's decisions, and Pope Sixtus III reminds the Illyrian bishops of their obligations to his vicar at Thessaloniki.

=== By place ===
==== Byzantium ====
- Emperor Theodosius II forbids the divulging of secrets of naval carpentry, probably to avoid its spread to the rising Vandal power in North Africa.
- February 15 – The Codex Theodosianus, a collection of edicts of Roman law, is published.
- Aelia Eudocia, wife of Theodosius II, goes on a pilgrimage to Jerusalem, bringing back with her holy relics to prove her faith.

==== Europe ====
- The last gladiatorial fights are held in the Colosseum in Rome.
- King Hermeric of the Suebic Kingdom of Galicia is forced to retire after a seven-year illness. He hands the government over to his son Rechila.
- In the Gothic War (436-439) besieges Flavius Aetius over the Visigoths in the Battle of Mons Colubrarius.

==== Persia ====
- Bahram V dies after an 18-year reign as Sassanid king of the Persian Empire. He is succeeded by his son Yazdegerd II.

=== By topic ===
==== Religion ====
- Relics of John Chrysostom are transported to Constantinople.

=== By place ===
==== Europe ====
- Battle of Guoloph: Vitalinus (possibly Vortigern) is defeated at the hands of Ambrosius Aurelianus, and a combined force of Romano-British forces from across southern Britain.
- Gothic War (436-439): Litorius, Roman general (Magister militum per Gallias), lays siege to Toulouse. During the decisive battle before the walls he suffers a severe defeat and is killed, and only the heavy loss of Visigoths makes King Theodoric I decide to agree to a provisional restoration of the status quo.
- Licinia Eudoxia, wife of emperor Valentinian III, is granted the title of Augusta following the birth of their daughter Eudocia.

==== Byzantium ====
- Winter – Hun and Roman envoys meet at Margum (modern Bosnia and Herzegovina), an important market town on the Sava River. After negotiations, Attila and his brother Bleda, who are present, accept a four-point peace plan. Trading rights between the two states are confirmed and emperor Theodosius II pays an annual tribute of 700 pounds of gold.

==== Africa ====
- Vandal War (439-442): King Genseric breaks his treaty with the Western Roman Empire and invades Africa Proconsularis.
- October 19 – Carthage falls to the Vandals. Genseric makes it his capital and establishes the Vandal Kingdom.
- The Vandals establish a North African granary that enables them to enforce their will on other nations, who are dependent on North Africa for grain and other food staples.

==== Asia ====
- The Northern Wei empire annexes Northern Liang and unifies Northern China, concluding the Sixteen Kingdoms era.

=== By topic ===
==== Religion ====
- Isaac the Great, Armenian apostolic patriarch, dies at Ashtishat. He helped to develop a Greek-inspired alphabet, and translate the Bible, along with various Christian writings, into Armenian.
- The Historia Ecclesiastica of Socrates of Constantinople is concluded, perhaps due to the author's death.
- The monastery of Mar Saba is founded near Bethlehem (Palestine).

== Births ==
430

- Asclepigenia, Athenian philosopher and mystic (d. 485)
- Julius Nepos, Western Roman Emperor (d. 480)
- Marcia Euphemia, Roman Empress (approximate date)
- Sidonius Apollinaris, bishop and diplomat (approximate date)
- Syagrius, Roman official and son of Aegidius
- Victor Vitensis, African bishop (approximate date)
- Xiao Wu Di, emperor of the Liu Song dynasty (d. 464)

431

- Anastasius I, emperor of the Byzantine Empire (approximate date)
- Odoacer, first "barbarian" king of Italy (d. 493)

432

- Moninne, one of Ireland's early women saints (approximate date).

433

- Liu Bing, high official of the Liu Song dynasty (d. 477)

436

- Wang Zhenfeng, empress of the Liu Song dynasty (d. 479)

437

- Childeric I, king of the Salian Franks (approximate date)
- Remigius, bishop of Reims (approximate date)

438

- Basina, queen of Thuringia (approximate date)
- Epiphanius, bishop of Pavia (d. 496)

439

- Eudocia, Vandal queen and daughter of Valentinian III
- Ming Di, emperor of the Liu Song Dynasty (d. 472)
- Sabbas the Sanctified, Christian monk and saint (d. 532)

== Deaths ==
430

- May – Flavius Felix, Roman consul
- August 28 – Augustine of Hippo, bishop and theologian (b. 354)
- Abdas, bishop of Susa
- Saint Aurelius, bishop of Carthage (approximate date)
- Feng Ba, emperor of the Chinese state Northern Yan
- Nilus of Sinai, bishop and saint (approximate date)
- Octar, Hunnic ruler (approximate date)
- Plutarch of Athens, Greek philosopher

431

- June 22 – Paulinus of Nola, Christian bishop and poet (b. 354)
- Qifu Mumo, prince of the Chinese Xianbei state Western Qin

432

- July 27 – Pope Celestine I
- Anicia Faltonia Proba, Roman noblewoman
- Bonifacius, Roman general and governor in Africa (born 354 BC).
- Helian Ding, emperor of the Chinese Xiongnu state Xia.
- Saint Ninian, missionary in Scotland (approximate date)
- Wang Hong, official of the Liu Song dynasty (b. 379)

433

- Juqu Mengxun, prince of the Xiongnu state Northern Liang (b. 368)
- Xie Lingyun, Chinese poet of the Southern and Northern dynasties (b. 385)
- Huiguo, Chinese Buddhist Abbess (b. 364)

434

- April 12 – Maximianus, archbishop of Constantinople
- Helian Chang, emperor of the Chinese Xiongnu state Xia
- Rugila, king of the Huns (approximate date)
- Tao Sheng, Chinese Buddhist scholar

435

- John Cassian, Desert Father and theologian
- Pelagius, British monk (approximate date)
- Philip of Side, Christian church historian (approximate date)
- Rabbula, bishop of Edessa

436

- April 9 – Tan Daoji, general of the Liu Song dynasty
- Chu Lingyuan, last empress of the Jin dynasty (b. 384)
- Gunther, king of the Burgundians (approximate date)

437

- Li Jingshou, princess of the Xiongnu state Northern Liang

438

- Bahram V, king of the Persian Empire
- Feng Hong, last emperor of Northern Yan

439

- Isaac, patriarch of Armenia (b. 338)
- Litorius, general of the Western Roman Empire
- Sima Maoying, empress of the Liu Song Dynasty (b. 393)
- Spearthrower Owl, ruler of Teotihuacan (Mexico)
