= Aetius campaign in the Alps =

Aetius' campaign in the Alps
- Part of the Fall of the Roman Empire and Roman–Germanic Wars
- Italia Annoaria
Date	430–431 CE
Location	Raetia, Noricum
Result	Roman victory

Belligerents
Western Roman Empire	Juthungi; Nori

Commanders and leaders
Flavius Aetius; Avitus; Merobaudes	Unknown

Aetius' campaign in the Alps was a military campaign of the Roman army in the northern Alpine region, where the dioceses Raetia and Noricum were situated. The campaign was directed against the Juthungi and the rebellious population of Noricum (the Nori). The command of the campaign was in the hands of magister militium Aëtius and it began in the spring of 430 CE. In May, the campaign was interrupted to continued the following year.

== Background ==
The Roman Empire had ended up in a difficult situation by the end of the fourth century when the East Roman army suffered a heavy defeat at Adrianople against the Goths in 378. After that, a series of civil wars broke out that aggravated the situation. In 395 the empire was divided in two and Raetia and Noricum belonged to the western empire.

At the end of the fourth century, living conditions for the civilian population north of the Alps were still bearable. Stilicho's campaign against Alarik in the Gothic War in 403 and the passage of Radagaisus army in 405 had been spared them. Nevertheless, the population increasingly experienced the adverse consequences of the exhausting wars that the army waged to maintain the Roman Empire. To keep the army up to date, units were constantly withdrawn from the border and supplemented with barbaric foederati. In addition, the military was a huge cost item for the empire. As a result of the internal conflicts and defensive battles against barbarians, the population experienced an increasing tax burden. Historians see these deteriorating economic conditions as the main cause of the dissatisfaction that led to the Nori uprising in the years around 430/431. Heather suggests that the uprising was the same as that of the Bagaudae in Brittany and Spain. According to him, it had been nothing more than a decision by the population to organize themselves after the empire had left them to their own devices for more than two decades.

Hydatius calls the invasion of the Juthungen and the revolt of the Nori in a sentence, which may indicate that the raid and revolt took place simultaneously. The Juthungen were a Germanic tribe living north of the Danube that had made themselves heard before in history. The last time had been during a raid in 383 under the rule of Emperor Valentinian II.

== Start ==
=== Raid of the Juthungen ===
In late 429 or early 430, the Juthungi crossed the Danube and invaded the province of Reaetia Segunda. As on other occasions in the history of the Roman Empire, the reduction of troops at the border and the invasion of the Vandals in Africa was the most plausible reason for the Juthungi to invade the empire. Aetius, appointed magister equitum praesentalis since 429 and thus in rank equal to Felix, ended his campaign against the Goths at Arles and put his army into position. The army he led consisted of his own Hunse bucellari and parts of the imperial army the praesentalis from Italy. The later emperor Avitus, and the poet Merobaudes were also part of this army.

=== Battle near Augusta Vindilicorum ===
As soon as the Alpine passes were passable, the army headed for Raetia in the north and fought the attackers. In all likelihood, fights took place near the city of Augusta Vindelicorum (present-day Augsburg). An inscription has been found in this city that is associated with the campaign of Aetius in Raetia. The campaign ended with a quick and complete victory of the Romans. According to another inscription, Merobaudes distinguished himself in battle. He was honored with a statue at the Forum of Trajan.

=== Conspiracy in Ravenna ===
It is assumed that Aetius did not chase the retreating Juthungi across the Danube River. Reports about the bad campaign against the Vandals in Africa forced him to interrupt his campaign. He returned with his army to Ravenna for consultation. However, the consultation with his colleague magister militum praesentalis Felix, about the following strategy led to a crisis. According to Wijendaele, the rivalry between Aetius and Felix was the basis for this. This one erupted because Aëtius had to give up part of his force before the war against the Vandals. There broke out mutiny at this army unit that committed an attack on Felix. He was murdered along with his wife. Prosper points to Aëtius as if he had had a hand in this.

=== Continuation of the campaign against the Nori ===
In 431 Aetius resumed his campaign in the northern Alps, this time he deployed his army against the rebellious inhabitants of the province of Noricum. The Nori revolt was violently defeated. According to Wijendaele, he burned the province and returned to Italy loaded with loot. The games held in Rome in 432 in his honor were financed with this.

== Aftermath ==
After the fall of Felix, Aëtius has become the most powerful soldier of the Western Roman Empire. Aetius' performance put evil blood on the imperial authority in Ravenna. The tension between the quirky general and Galla Placidia led her to put all her pawns on Bonifatius and she dropped Aetius. When Aëtius left Italy in 432 to participate in the war against the Franks, she lets Bonifatius return from Africa and appoints him as her new commander in chief. Aëtius's reaction is not long in coming and a Roman civil war breaks out between him and Bonifatius.

== Sources and interpretation ==
A number of contemporary historians: Priscus, Prosper, Hydatius report about a campaign against the Juthungi and the Nori in 430 and 431 by Aëtius. Background information about the how and why of this campaign is largely lacking. Only Prosper lights up a tip of the veil by telling that there was a conspiracy against Aetius by Felix and Galla Placidia, and that Felix was murdered by Aetius. In addition to the circumstances that Aetius kept away in the conflict between Felix and Bonifatius and did not contribute to the war against the Vandals, see current historians in the accusing of Prosper, an indication that the two main generals of the Western army did not cooperate, or that there was a high-escending conflict that To an eruption came.

=== Order of events ===
The order of the events do not match in the sources. In general, more importance is attached to that of Hydatius because he visited Aëtius as an envoy on a diplomatic mission. If one maintains the order of Hydatius' events, Aëtius first campaigned against a group of Goths near Arles in the early spring of 430, before targeting the Juthungen and Nori. It was only after he had defeated the Goths did Aetius leave for the Alps.

== Bibliography ==
- Heather, Peter (2005). The Fall of the Roman Empire: A New History of Rome and the Barbarians (2nd ed.). New York: Oxford University Press. ISBN 0-19-515954-3.
- Scharf, Ralf (1994). "Der Iuthungenfeldzug des Aetius". Tyche: Beiträge zur Alten Geschichte Papyrologie und Epigraphik (in German). 9: 131–145.
- Wijnendaele, Jeroen W. P. (2017). "The early career of Aëtius and the murder of Felix". Historia: Zeitschrift für Alte Geschichte. 66 (4): 468–482. JSTOR 45019274.
- Syvänne, Ilkka (2020). Military History of Late Rome 425–457. Pen and Sword Military. ISBN 978-1-4738-7217-2.
