= Roman civil war of 427–429 =

Civil war between the West Roman Generals Bonifatius and Aetius

Roman Civil War of 427–429
- Part of Fall of the Western Roman Empire
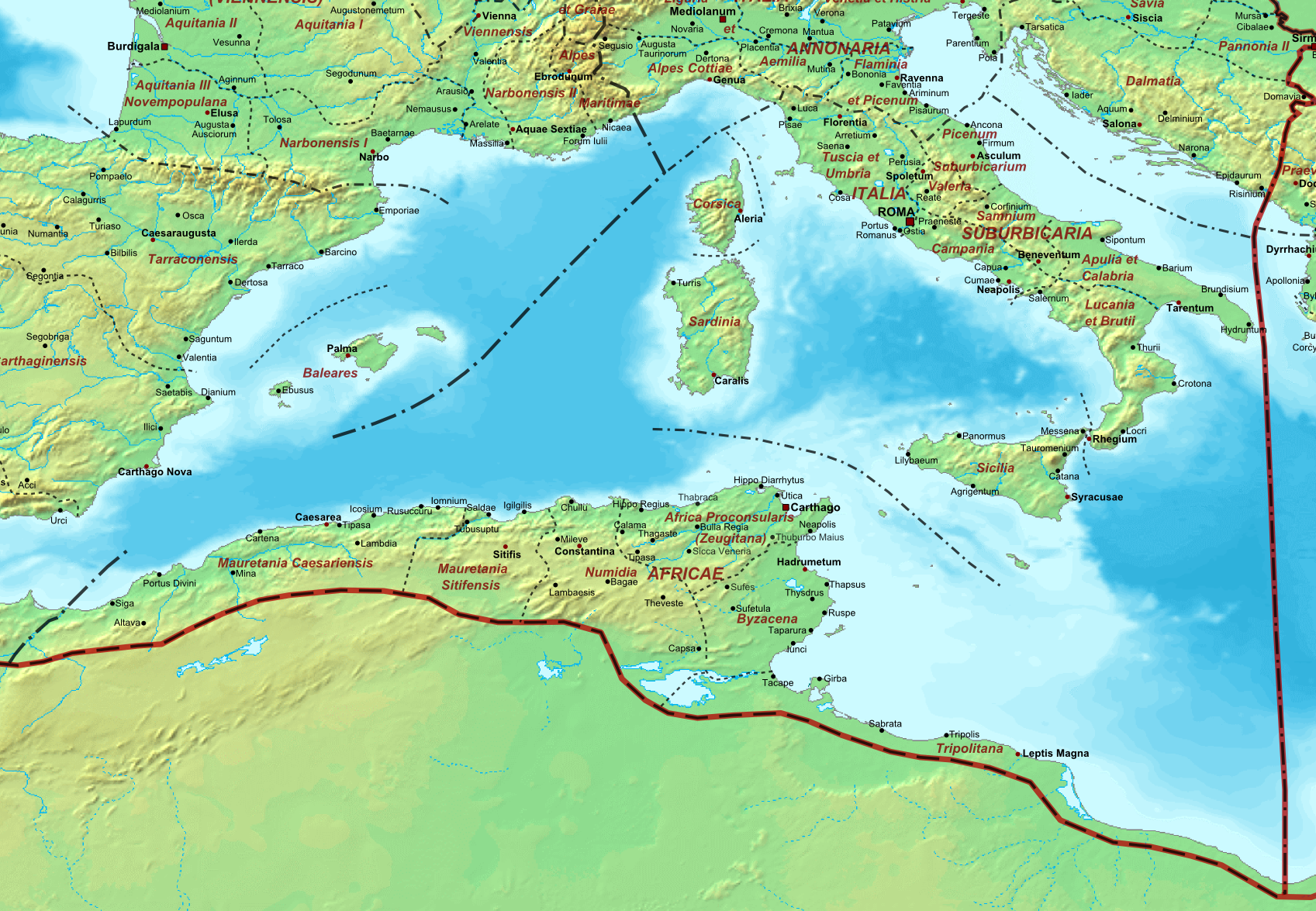
- Diocese of Africa around 425
Date	427–429
Location	Africa
Result	Victory for Felix

Commanders and leaders
Bonifatius	Felix; Sigisvultus; Mavortius, Gallio and Sanoeces

Strength
5,000–9,000	10,000–15,000

The Roman civil war of 427–429 was a civil war during the reign of the West Roman emperor Valentinian III. In that period there was a power struggle going on between the generals Felix and Bonifatius that degenerated into an armed conflict. When the central government tried to deput Bonifatius as governor of North-Africa, he separated his territory from the empire without proclaiming himself emperor. He carried the personal loyalty of the African troops and lead them at his discretion during this war. Bonifatius was able to successfully defy and resist state authority. The civil war ended with a truce after which peace was made.

== Prelude ==
In 425, the West-Roman emperor Joannes was overthrun by an intervention by the East-Roman emperor Theodosius II. After this, Valentinianus, the son of the late emperor Constantinus III was crowned Western emperor in Rome. Because he was only six years old, he could not rule the empire himself. Several high-ranking persons interfered in the exercise of the emperorship, including the emperor of the eastern part of the empire Theodosius II (his cousin), his mother Galla Placidia and the commander-in-chief of the Roman army (magister utriusque militum) Castinus.

Boniface, who had played a key role in the restoration of the Theodosian dynasty in the West, was only rewarded with the function of comes domesticorum (commander of the imperial house troops). Not Bonefatius, but the hitherto unknown Felix received the highest generalship of the western field army. With Boniface who had counted on this high office himself, this appointment put evil blood.

In this appointment can clearly be recognized the hand of the East Roman emperor Theodosius II. Castinus who was serving this function before, was removed and exiled because he was Joannes ally and therefore considered unreliable. Another general of the ancient regime Aëtius had made a deal with the new regime that gave him the high office of Praefectus praetorio in Gaul. Bonifatius was not satisfied with his new appointment. He refused to give up his position as comes Africae of the African dioces (provinces) with which he separated himself from the rest of the empire.

== The Civil War ==
=== Beginning ===
The first step that led to the civil war was taken by Felix in 427. He had the Senate declare Bonifatius as an enemy of the state after he refused to appear before the court in Ravenna, to answer for an indictment of high treason. In the charge, Bonifatius was accused of wanting to create his own empire in Roman Africa. The indictment was drawn up by Felix, his opponent installed by Theodosius II as the magister militia of the West. After this, an army was prepared to overthrow Bonifatius in Africa.

=== The campaign in Africa ===
Felix equipped a large army commanded by three generals: Mavortius, Gallio and Sanoeces. Mavortius and Gallio led the actual Roman troops, while Sanoeces commanded the Huns Foederati troops. Together, the three generals besieged Boniface in Carthago, where Boniface had entrenched himself. However, during the siege, disagreement broke out between the commanders. One of the generals murdered his two colleagues to be murdered by Boniface in turn (Prosper s.a. 427). When this news reached Ravenna, Felix sent a new force to Africa under the command of the Gothic general Sigisvult. He succeed to conquer the coastal towns, after which Boniface withdrew with his troops into the interior of Numidia. For the whole of 428, no more fights took place and a truce was struck.

=== Peace negotiations ===
According to Procopius sent Placidia an envoy to Boniface in 429 to negotiate peace, from whom she heard that a forged letter was in circulation in which Boniface was advised not to go to Ravenna if asked to do so. As a result, Placidia sent a negotiator Darius to conduct the talks on her behalf. This one managed to iron the folds, the war could be ended. Boniface's position at court was restored, with which he was again assigned an influential role. Nevertheless, the imperial envoy Darius confessed in a letter to Augustine that there was still enmity between the two parties.

== Aftermath ==
Despite having to take on three imperial armies in less than five years, Boniface remained undefeated. At the same time, the course of the last years of civil war indicated the limits of his private power. His quarrel with Ravenna meant that Boniface could only rely on his Gothic bucellari. In exchange for their support, it was permissible for them to provide for their own sustenance by plundering the locals. At the same time, the daughter of Boniface was baptized as an Arian priest. In these circumstances, Bonifatius could only resign, it would cost him the friendship of Augustine.

The negotiations that led to the reconciliation with Ravenna in 429 that restored the relationship were just in time to face the Vandal invasion. Soon, Bonifatius was involved in a new war. For fourteen months they Vandals would besiege Boniface in the city Hippo Regius. Augustine would not experience the end of the siege and died in the summer of 430. An auxiliary army was sent from the combined forces East and West under the command of Aspar. After a second defeat, Placidia called him back to deal with Aëtius, while Aspar remained in Africa to keep the Vandals under control.

=== Warlord ===
Thanks to his Gothic bucellari, Boniface was the first Roman soldier to successfully defy and resist state authority. When the central government tried to deject him, he separated from the empire without proclaiming himself emperor, which had always been the usual course of events of rebels to legitimize their position. Boniface carried the personal loyalty of his troops and was able to lead them at his own discretion during this war, in exchange for providing protection - even at the expense of the Roman people. All these elements made Boniface the first successful exponent of what can be described as 'warlord' in the Western Roman army.

== Primary sources ==
- Procopius, The Vandalic war
- Prosper, Epitoma Chronicon

== Secondary sources ==
- Mathisen, Ralph W. (1999). "Sigisvult the Patrician, Maximinus the Arian and political strategems in het Western Roman Empire c. 425-40". Early Medieval Europe. 8 (2): 173–196. doi:10.1111/1468-0254.00043.
- Wijnendaele, J.P. (2016). "Warlordism and the Disintegration in the Western army". In Jeremy Armstrong (ed.). Circum Mare: Themes in Ancient Warfare. Brill.
