= Roman civil war of 432 =

War in the Western Roman Empire

Roman Civil War of 432
- Part of Fall of the Western Roman Empire
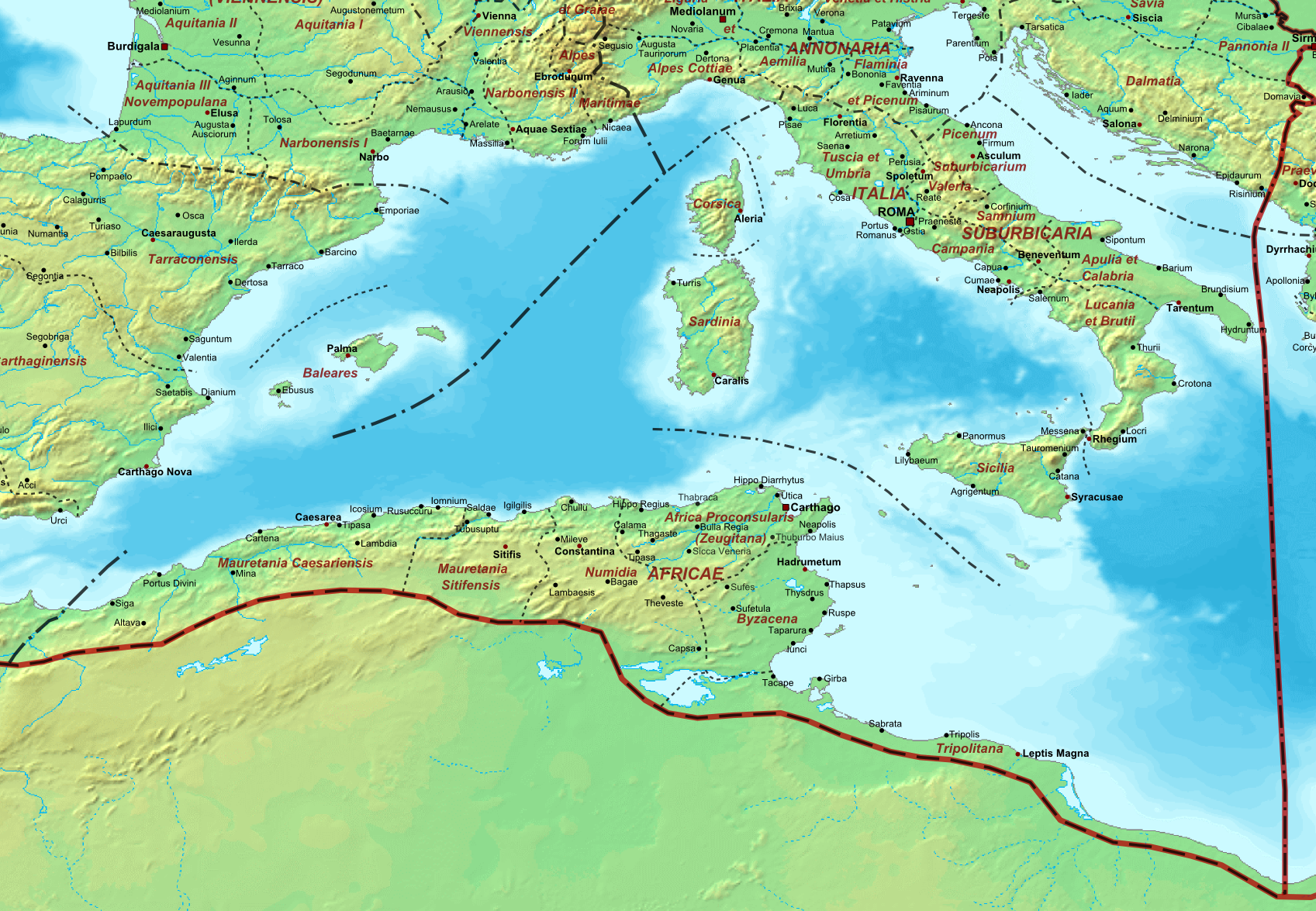
- Map of Africa and Italy
Date	432
Location	Italia, Western Roman Empire
Result	Aetian victory

Commanders and leaders
Bonifatius †; Sebastianus	Flavius Aetius

Strength
7,000–10,000	7,000–10,000

The Roman Civil War (432) was a military conflict between the Roman generals Aetius and Bonifatius during the reign of Emperor Valentinian III. The war was fought on Italian soil and was decided in the Battle of Rimini. Although Aetius lost the battle, the war ended in his favor, as Bonifatius was wounded in the battle and later died of his injuries.

Alongside the two generals, Galla Placidia, regent during the years 429 to 432, was an important figure in the conflict. She was unable to prevent her two leading generals from fighting each other rather than the Vandals in present-day North Africa and the Huns in Pannonia. Her decision in 432 to strip Aetius of his command of the Roman army and transfer it to Bonifatius effectively laid the groundwork for the conflict.

== Background ==
=== Usurpation of Joannes ===
Aetius and Bonifatius were both ambitious generals who emerged in the turbulent period following the death of Emperor Honorius in 423. They became involved in a series of political and military confrontations, including the usurpation of Joannes (423–425), who was proclaimed emperor by the Roman Senate in opposition to the heirs of Honorius: his sister Galla Placidia, her young son Valentinian, and Valentinian's cousin Theodosius II, emperor of the East Roman Empire.

In 425, a civil war broke out that was won by the heirs of Honorius. After the war, Aetius, who had supported Joannes, was promoted to a command in the province of Gallia, while Bonifatius, a supporter of Galla Placidia, was sidelined.

=== Civil war between Bonifatius and Felix ===
Bonifatius disagreed with the course of events that followed the fall of Joannes, and therefore refused to leave his post in North Africa. Through his marriage to the Gothic princess Pelagia, he had a private army consisting mainly of Gothic bucellarii, and the regular army in Africa, the comitatenses, had remained loyal to him. This enabled him to act independently and pursue his own course.

A new confrontation arose in 427, when a plot was hatched against Bonifatius. In response, he separated North Africa from the empire. This period is known as the Civil War of 427–429, in which Bonifatius and the commander-in-chief of the Roman army, Felix, opposed each other. The conflict ended when Galla Placidia was reconciled with Bonifatius.

Aetius stayed aloof from this conflict until he was appointed to the rank of magister militum in 429. This was the junior of the two offices of comes et magister utriusque militiae; the senior office was held by Felix, who was thus the most influential man in those years and also a supporter of Galla Placidia.

== Prelude ==
=== War against the Vandals in Africa ===
Following his reconciliation with Galla Placidia, Bonifatius left Ravenna in 429 and returned to North Africa to campaign against the Vandals. By 430, the Vandals had conquered Mauretania Tingitana and Mauretania and had begun to invade Numidia, where Bonifatius awaited them with his army. The Romans were defeated by the Vandals in the Battle of Calama in early 430, after which Bonifatius withdrew to Hippo Regius, which was besieged from May 430. During the siege, the church father Augustine died.

After 14 months of siege, Bonifatius handed the city over to the Vandal king and withdrew to join forces with the East Roman general Aspar, who had arrived by sea from Constantinople with an army. In early 432, Bonifatius and Aspar joined battle against Geiseric, but the Romans were again defeated.

=== Conspiracy against Aetius ===
Reportedly, Felix began a conspiracy against Aetius after the latter's promotion, but Aetius anticipated him and planned an assassination. In May 430, Felix and his wife were murdered in the Ursiana Basilica in Ravenna. After Felix's death, Aetius obtained the senior position of magister militum. Nevertheless, he left Italy to return to Gaul, where he defeated an army of plundering Goths near Arles, then turned to a campaign in the Alps against raiding Iuthungi and Bagaudae in Raetia and Noricum.

According to Wijnendaele, Aetius carried out these actions without the approval of the imperial government in Ravenna, and his campaigns in Gaul and Noricum resulted from the unwillingness of the army, or of his Huns, to participate in an overseas campaign against the Vandals in Africa. Instead, he suppressed the raids in the north, from where he could easily monitor the imperial seat of Ravenna, before campaigning against the Franks.

=== Rivalry between Aetius and Bonifatius ===
After the execution of Felix in 430, Aetius and Bonifatius remained the most influential generals of the empire, competing for the favor of Galla Placidia. In 432, Aetius held the consulship, an honorary office. Bonifatius, however, was recalled to Italy that year and warmly received by Placidia, who gave him the rank of patrician, also an honorary office, as well as the senior comes et magister utriusque militiae (commander-in-chief) position, while Aetius was deprived of his military command. With these decisions, Placidia put the two generals on a collision course.

== War between Bonifatius and Aetius ==
Believing that his downfall was imminent, Aetius openly revolted against the imperial authority in Ravenna and marched from Gaul against Bonifatius, who remained in the city. Aetius had brought his own army from the West, which he had originally intended to deploy against the Suebi in Spain, while Bonifatius had some of his troops from Africa with him, mainly bucellarii, together with the Italian field army. In 432, the two armies clashed in the Battle of Rimini, fought five Roman miles outside Ariminum (present-day Rimini).

Bonifatius triumphed, but he would not enjoy his victory for long. He had been wounded during the battle and died of his injuries a few months later.

== Aftermath and end ==
After Bonifatius's death, his son-in-law Sebastianus took over his position as commander-in-chief and continued the war in Italy. He attempted to capture Aetius, who had withdrawn to one of his fortified estates in Italy after his defeat at Rimini, but Aetius managed to escape and sought refuge with the Huns in Pannonia. He traveled to the court of his friend, the Hun king Rua, and, after acquiring a new army, returned to Italy.

With the help of this army, Aetius prevailed, although Hughes notes that there is no real evidence that he returned with an army of Huns. He reconciled with Galla Placidia, who again offered him the position of comes et magister utriusque militiae (commander-in-chief). Aetius then had Sebastianus exiled from Italy, seized Bonifatius's property, and married his widow, Pelagia.

Aetius thus emerged as the victor of the civil war and the most powerful man in the Western Roman Empire. Galla Placidia no longer played a meaningful role, and in 437 she was sidelined when her son Valentinian III attained his majority. Valentinian III would prove a weak emperor.

=== Consequences ===
With the death of Bonifatius, the period in which several generals had fought for control of the Western Roman Empire came to an end. The episode eventually cost the empire the provinces of Mauretania Tingitana, Mauretania Caesariensis, Africa and Pannonia. Aetius was left as the last of the rival generals and had thereby become the de facto ruler of the West, but he chose not to become emperor himself.

According to Wijnendaele, this decision broke the Western imperial government's monopoly on violence, paving the way for future warlord–commanders and for the disintegration of the Western army in the second half of the fifth century.

== Literature ==
- Bury, John Bagnall (1923). History of the Later Roman Empire. Dover Books.
- Hughes, Ian (2020). Aëtius: Attila's Nemesis. Pen & Sword Military.
- McEvoy, Meaghan (2013). Child Emperor Rule in the Late Roman West, AD 367-455. Oxford University Press. p. 247.
- Wijnendaele, Jeroen P. (2016). Last of the Romans: Bonifatius - Warlord and Comes Africae. New York: Bloomsbury Academic.
- Wijnendaele, Jeroen P. (2017). "The early career of Aëtius and the murder of Felix (c. 425-430 CE)". Historia: Zeitschrift für Alte Geschichte. 66 (4): 468–482. JSTOR 45019274.
