= Gothic War (436–439) =

5th-century war between the Visigoths and the Western Roman Empire

Gothic War of 436–439
- Part of the Fall of the Roman Empire; Gothic Wars and Roman–Germanic Wars
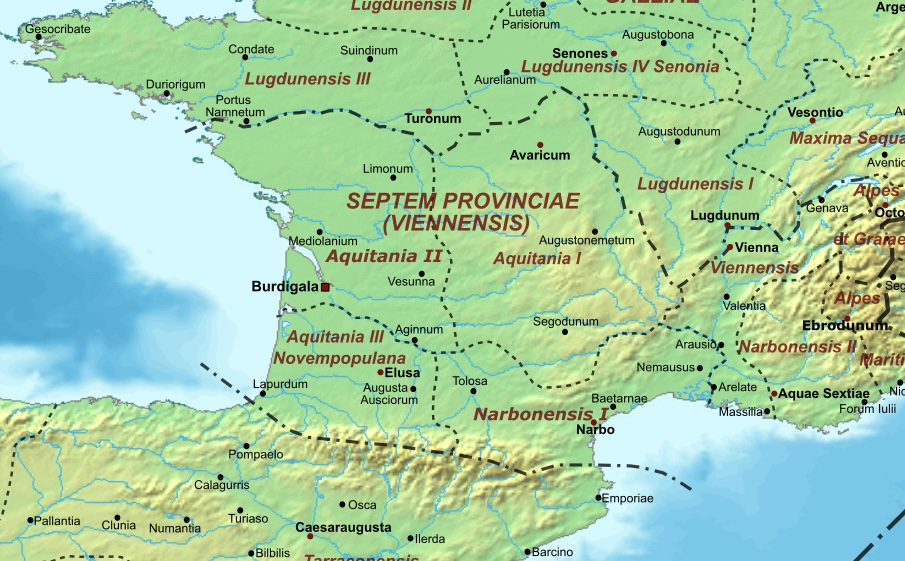
- map of Southern Gaul
Date	436–439
Location	France
Result	Roman victory

Belligerents
Western Roman Empire	Visigoths

Commanders and leaders
Flavius Aetius; Litorius; Sigisvult	Theodoric I

The Gothic War (436–439) was a military conflict between the Gothic foederati and the Western Roman Empire, under Emperor Valentinian III. It occurred primarily in the Gallic provinces from 436 to 439. The key figures involved were the Gothic leader Theodoric I and the Roman army's commander-in-chief, Aetius. Contemporary sources characterize this conflict as a war. Additionally, there were uprisings of the Burgundians and the Bagaudae during the same period.

== Sources ==
The origins of the Gothic War (436–439) and the specific engagements that occurred during its course are poorly documented. The absence of comprehensive records detailing the battles makes it challenging to reconstruct the war's progression. Our available knowledge is derived primarily from fragmentary accounts provided by chroniclers, supplemented by occasional references found in the works of poets, rhetoricians, and theologians. Prosper is the most significant primary source documenting the events, with additional insights provided by Hydatius and Sidonius Apollinaris.

== Background ==
The Visigoths settled in Gallia Aquitaine as foederati after the Gothic War in Spain in 418. However, they proved to be unreliable between 418 and 435. In 426, a significant uprising against the Roman Empire occurred, which was quelled by military intervention led by Aetius. Furthermore, in 430, Aetius defeated a Gothic army.

=== Causes ===
As with the earlier rebellion of Theodoric I, the reason for this war is not clear from contemporary sources. Therefore, its origins must be inferred from the political situation of the Roman Empire at the time. The empire was relatively stable compared to the preceding decade, following the resolution of the Civil War between Bonifatius and Aetius, which concluded in favor of the latter. Consequently, Aetius became the most influential figure in the Western Empire from 433 to 450. He attained the rank of magnificus vir parens patriusque noster and assumed the role of 'protector' of the empress mother Galla Placidia and her young son Valentinian III.

However, new tensions arose with the emergence of formidable forces such as the Burgundian foederati under King Gunther, who wielded significant influence in eastern Gaul and posed a threat to Aetius. Furthermore, Theodoric I remained resolute in his quest for power, further complicating the political situation.

== The course of the war ==
=== Start ===
Campaign of the Roman army in 436-439

In 436, while the Roman army was dealing with a Bagaudae uprising in Gallia Lugdunensis and a resurgence of Burgundian activity, Theodoric terminated the treaty with the Romans. According to Hughes, an alliance formed between the Goths and the Burgundians, prompted by Theodoric's dissatisfaction with Roman rule and his desire to expand into areas bordering the Mediterranean. Theodoric launched invasions into neighboring regions, prioritizing the capture of Narbonne, a key coastal city. His forces besieged the city, while also securing access to Spain by defeating garrisons stationed at the Pyrenean passes.

=== Aetius's reaction ===
The Roman army took some time to mobilize against the Goths. Aetius, the commander-in-chief of the Western Roman army, was in Italy attending games held to celebrate his appointment as patrician. The simultaneous outbreak of the Gothic and Burgundian revolts compelled him to deploy the army efficiently. In Gaul, he only had the Comitatenses field army at his disposal. General Litorius had already been sent to suppress the Bagaudae insurgents with a part of this force. Aetius, who had established a delicate peace throughout his vast empire, was reluctant to lead the Goths with units from other regions, as he feared it would leave those areas vulnerable. Instead, he sent a delegation to the court of the Hun King Rua, requesting military assistance. Although the timing is uncertain, it is highly likely that in 436–437, the Huns were granted parts of Pannonia near the River Save.

Prior to the arrival of this army in Gaul, Aetius utilized the available forces to suppress the combined Gothic and Burgundian uprising.

=== Litorius's campaign ===
In 436, General Litorius successfully suppressed the Bacaudian uprising in Armorica. He then led his army southward and, in 437, joined forces with a contingent of Huns to quell the Gothic revolt.

Litorius focused his efforts on Narbonne, which was under siege by the Goths. However, upon the arrival of the Roman forces, the Goths retreated, leaving the city relieved. Subsequently, Litorius engaged the Goths in Aquitaine, shifting the conflict to the heartland of Gothic territory. Theodoric's army found itself progressively pushed into a defensive position, eventually retreating to its stronghold in the capital, Toulouse, which came under siege by the Romans. Following a prolonged siege, Theodoric eventually surrendered to General Litorius.

=== Armistice and resumption of the war ===
Theodoric was forced to lay down his arms and honor the treaty with the Romans, which obligated him to provide troops to the Roman army in the event of a setback against the Suebi in Spain in 438. Despite the reconciliation between the Goths and Romans, hostilities resumed. Historians speculate that developments in Spain and the Mediterranean, where the Vandals were increasingly engaged in piracy, contributed to this resurgence of conflict. Sources indicate a renewed large-scale war that initially challenged the Goths.

Upon Aetius's return to Ravenna following the marriage of Valentinian III and Licinia Eudoxia in Constantinople in early 438, he made changes to the command structure of the army in Gaul. Avitus, likely serving as magister militum per Gallias, assumed the role of praefectus praetorio Galliarum, with Litorius succeeding him. Aetius himself temporarily assumed supreme command and actively participated in the war effort.

=== Battle of Mons Colubrarius ===
One of the few notable achievements documented regarding Aëtius' involvement recounts a significant victory he achieved in a pivotal battle, during which he purportedly vanquished 8,000 Goths.

Given the political exigencies in Ravenna, Aëtius found it necessary to entrust the continuation of the Gothic war to Litorius after this engagement. In recognition of his efforts, the emperor commissioned the erection of a statue in his honor, with Merobaudes delivering laudatory remarks. Presumably, Aëtius possessed ample confidence in the strategic acumen of his generals, Litorius and Sigisvult, particularly considering the substantial setback the Goths had previously suffered.

=== Battle of Toulouse ===
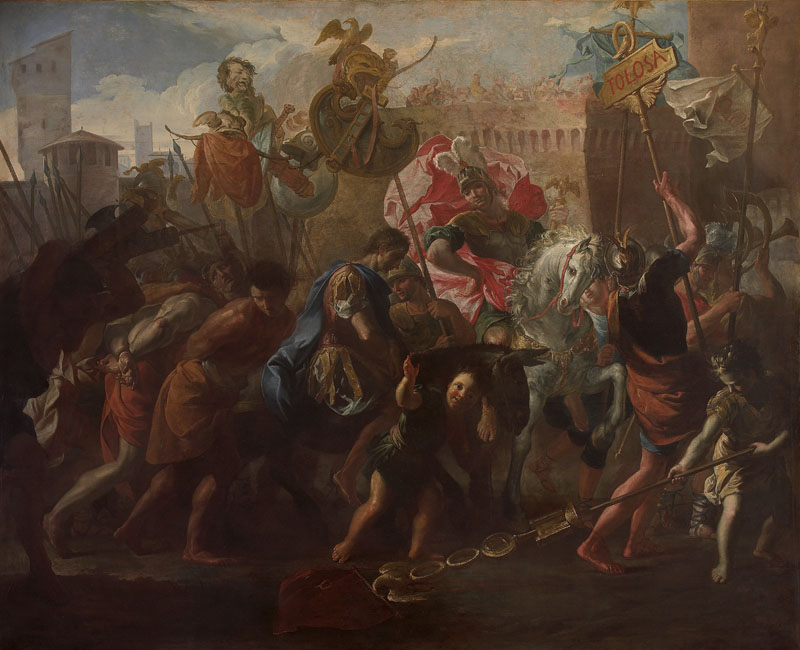
Capture of Litorius by Theodoric at the battle of Toulouse, Antoine Rivalz (1706)

In 439, the Visigoths were forced to retreat to their capital, Toulouse, due to increasing defensive pressure from the Romans. The Roman army, led by General Litorius, besieged Toulouse. King Theodoric I of the Visigoths attempted to attack the Roman camp during the siege but failed, resulting in heavy losses for his army. According to Prosper, "due to the thoughtfulness of the Romans, the opportunities turned and the Goths became the parent party." Additionally, after the failed attack, General Litorius was captured by the Goths and executed.

In the midst of the ensuing chaos, Vetericus, a Goth serving in the Roman army, temporarily assumed leadership. Prosper briefly states, "in the same period Vetericus was considered loyal to our state and known for the frequent demonstration of his skill in war". Vetericus successfully stabilized the situation following Theodoric's disastrous attempt. Subsequent battles occurred, and the Romans dispatched new troops, mainly consisting of auxiliary forces from the Huns, to confront the Goths.

== End of the war and consequences ==
In response to the emergent situation, Aetius took command of the Gallic army. In 439, Aetius traveled southward to end the conflict. Aetius aimed to conclude the war with a significant triumph, boosting morale in the West and thwarting further Gothic expansionist endeavors. He hastened towards Toulouse and initiated the siege of a Gothic military encampment near their capital. After a short break to build siege towers, Theodoric's forces breached the camp's defenses and overwhelmed its defenders, leaving them with no escape. Ultimately, the Romans emerged victorious, and the Visigoths suffered significant losses. Aetius was forced to make peace with the Visigoths, because he had to deploy part of his troops against the Vandals in the Vandal War, who had meanwhile taken Carthago.

=== Peace negotiations ===
The peace talks with Goths were conducted by the praetorian prefect Eparchius Avitus. According to Sidonius Apollinaris, it was largely thanks to his commitment that Theodoric made peace. The peace was in a way unsatisfactory for the Romans, because the victory was not complete and the Roman army had also come out of the battle battered. Probably some of the peace conditions held the departure from Aquitaine of the Alans, who had previously abandoned the Visigoths. Hydatius and Prosper date this peace in 439. The exact date would probably have been late in 439 or early 440, because it is known that Aetius returned to Italy in 440.

The Roman victory assured future Gothic submission for more than twenty years. Apart from a brief interlude under Thorismund, the Goths were loyal allies of the imperial government.

== Biography ==
- Thompson, E.A. (1982) Romans and Barbarians, University of Wisconsin Press, Madison WI
- Kulikowski, Michael (1997), The End of Roman Spain, University of Toronto.
- Harrison, D. (1999), de volksverhuizingen, Uitgeverij Omniboek, Utrecht
- McEvoy, Meaghan A. (2013), Child Emperor Rule in the Late Roman West, Oxford University Press
- Hughes, I. (2012), Aetius: Attila's Nemesis, Barnsley: Pen & Sword Military. ISBN 978-1783461349.
- Schultheis, Evan (2019), "The Battle of the Catalaunian Fields, AD 451: Flavius Aetius, Attila the Hun, and the Transformation of Gaul.", Barnsley: Pen & Sword Books Ltd.
- Hughes, I. (2020), Aetius: Attila's Nemesis, PEN & SWORD MILITARY
- Ilkka Syvänne (2020), Military History of Late Rome 425–457, Pen & Sword Books Ltd
