= Frankish War (431–432) =

- Part of the Fall of the Roman Empire and Roman–Germanic Wars
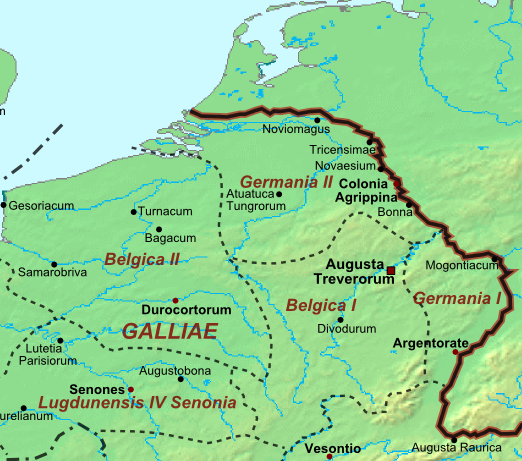
- Northern Gaul
Date	431–432
Location	Belgica Secunda and Germania Secunda
Result	Roman victory

Belligerents
Western Roman Empire	Franks

Commanders and leaders
Aetius	Chlodio

Strength
40,000	10,000–15,000

Casualties and losses
Unknown	Unknown

The Frankish War of 431–432 was a short war between the Franks and the Western Roman Empire under Emperor Valentinian III. Like the previous Frankish war, the Roman army was led by the Roman general Aetius and the participation of Chlodio, the king of the Salian Franks is uncertain. The war ended in a Roman victory after which both sides agreed to a peace treaty.

== Cause ==
The Frankish invasion of Northern Gaul in 431 is in a sense a continuation of the Frankish War of 428 and fits into the pattern of Frankish invasions in the first half of the fifth century. The cause of the war must be sought in the political situation of the Roman Empire at that time. For a large extent, it is the result of events at the beginning of the fifth century. The Crossing of the Rhine and the War of Radagaisus in 406, and the civil wars that followed had an enormous impact on the fighting power of the Roman army. The battles that were fought cost many lives. The army supplemented its shortages by withdrawing troops from the borders. For the Limitanei, the border guards, this meant a great loss. Auxiliary troops from Franks, Burgundians and Alans largely took over their task.

The loss of readiness of the Roman army became particularly evident on the border, where invasions from Germania were not vigorously punished. As far as we know, the campaigns were not thorough enough to drive out the attackers. This was a break with the past, when attacks on Roman soil always were followed by retaliatory actions by the army. Peace negotiations only followed after a punitive expedition. Aëtius's actions in the previous Frankish war were also not thorough enough. Although the Romans inflicted heavy losses on the invaders, they did not pursue them across the Rhine for a punitive campaign. Aëtius's operation in northern Gaul seems to have been short-lived and, crucially, it took place on imperial territory. It is reasonable to assume that the situation in northern Gaul soon deteriorated again as a result. The Franks were indeed forced to make peace, but because the Romans lacked resources and manpower, they subsequently left the border guarding to them.

=== The Franks and Chlodio's participation ===
It is unclear which Frankish tribe invaded northern Gaul in 431, Hydatius and Prosper provide no information on this. Of the Ripuarian Franks, who were settled east of the Rhine, we know that they attacked the city of Trier in 410, 413, 420, 435 and 453/461. Of the Salian Franks, we only know that they settled in Toxandria within the Roman Empire in 358 and only return to history shortly before the middle of the 5th century, by Gregory of Tours, who at the end of the 6th century in his writings cited Sulpicius Alexander and Renatus Profuturus Frigeridus, and reports on King Chlodio.

Chlodio may be the other main player in this war. He is the first Merovingian king whose existence is certain. Besides a brief mention in the Historia Francorum by Gregory of Tours, Chlodio is also mentioned in a Panegyric by Sidonius Apollinaris. He reports that around 448 Emperor Majorianus (457–461) defended the city of Tours against the Franks and that Aetius fought Chlodio in the open plains of Artois. Although Hydatius does not name a Frankish leader in his account of this event, historians suspect that Chlodio was already active in northern Gaul earlier. According to Gregory of Tours' account, Chlodio held power in the northernmost part of Gaul (Germania II) together with an area further to the northeast.

== The campaign of Aetius ==
In early 430, Aetius led the Roman army on a campaign in southern Gaul against marauding Goths. After the Goths were defeated, he marched his army north over the Alps towards Raetia and Noricum to stop the marauding Iuthungi and Bacaudae. About the same time, the Vandal War broke out in North Africa in all its fury. Roman troops left Italy to support general Bonifatius. This situation demanded the full attention of the imperial government in Ravenna.

For the Frankish foederati this was a golden opportunity to throw off the Roman yoke and extend their power over the rich area between the Rhine, the Somme, the Meuse and the North Sea. Aetius, who had until recently been responsible for the defence of Gaul, had taken many soldiers from the North to keep his army strong. From Toxandria Chlodio set out south and captured the garrison towns of Tournai and Cambrai.

Aetius successfully completed his campaign in the Alps and then marched with the army into northern Gaul. During the winter of 431/2 or in the spring of 432 he fought the Franks. According to Hydatius, Aetius defeated the Franks and concluded a peace treaty with them. After his defeat, Chlodio seems to have shifted his attack target to the areas east of the Rhine, where he succeeded in subduing the Thuringians around 439.

== Aftermath ==
The willingness to wage war against invaders in northern Gaul shows that the Romans had no intention of abandoning the Rhineland. However, they lacked sufficient military strength to subdue barbarians sufficiently militarily in the event of treaty violations. As early as 435, Ripuarian Franks plundered the city of Trier. It is unknown whether this attack was punished. This was followed by two Burgundian uprisings, which were suppressed by Aëtius. Chlodio made himself heard again in the period 445-450 when he again pushed west and conquered the Roman-inhabited cities of Turnacum (Doornik) and Cameracum (Cambrai).

== Secondary sources ==
- Davison, Christine Rachel (July 2013). "Chapter1: Barbarian agency and imperial withdrawal: the causes and consequences of political change in fourth- and fifth-century Trier and Cologne" (PDF). Late Antique Cities in the Rhineland: A Comparative Study of Trier and Cologne in the Fourth and Fifth Centuries (PhD thesis). University of Sheffield.
- Dierkens, A.; Pértin, P. (2003), The 5th-century advance of the Franks in Belgica II, history and archaeology
- Hughes, Ian (2012), Aetius: Attila's Nemesis, Pen & Sword Military, ISBN 978-1848842793
- Syvänne, Ilkka (2020), Military History of Late Rome 425–457, Pen & Sword Military, ISBN 978-1-4738-7217-2
- Wijnendaele, Jeroen W.P. (2017), "The early career of Aëtius and the murder of Felix", Historia: Zeitschrift für Alte Geschichte, 66 (4)
