= 430 =

430 in various calendars
- Gregorian calendar: 430; CDXXX
- Ab urbe condita: 1183
- Assyrian calendar: 5180
- Balinese saka calendar: 351–352
- Bengali calendar: −164 – −163
- Berber calendar: 1380
- Buddhist calendar: 974
- Burmese calendar: −208
- Byzantine calendar: 5938–5939
- Chinese calendar: 己巳年 (Earth Snake); 3127 or 2920 — to — 庚午年 (Metal Horse); 3128 or 2921
- Coptic calendar: 146–147
- Discordian calendar: 1596
- Ethiopian calendar: 422–423
- Hebrew calendar: 4190–4191
- Hindu calendars
- Vikram Samvat: 486–487
- Shaka Samvat: 351–352
- Kali Yuga: 3530–3531
- Holocene calendar: 10430
- Iranian calendar: 192 BP – 191 BP
- Islamic calendar: 198 BH – 197 BH
- Javanese calendar: 314–315
- Julian calendar: 430; CDXXX
- Korean calendar: 2763
- Minguo calendar: 1482 before ROC 民前1482年
- Nanakshahi calendar: −1038
- Seleucid era: 741/742 AG
- Thai solar calendar: 972–973
- Tibetan calendar: ས་མོ་སྦྲུལ་ལོ་ (female Earth-Snake); 556 or 175 or −597 — to — ལྕགས་ཕོ་རྟ་ལོ་ (male Iron-Horse); 557 or 176 or −596

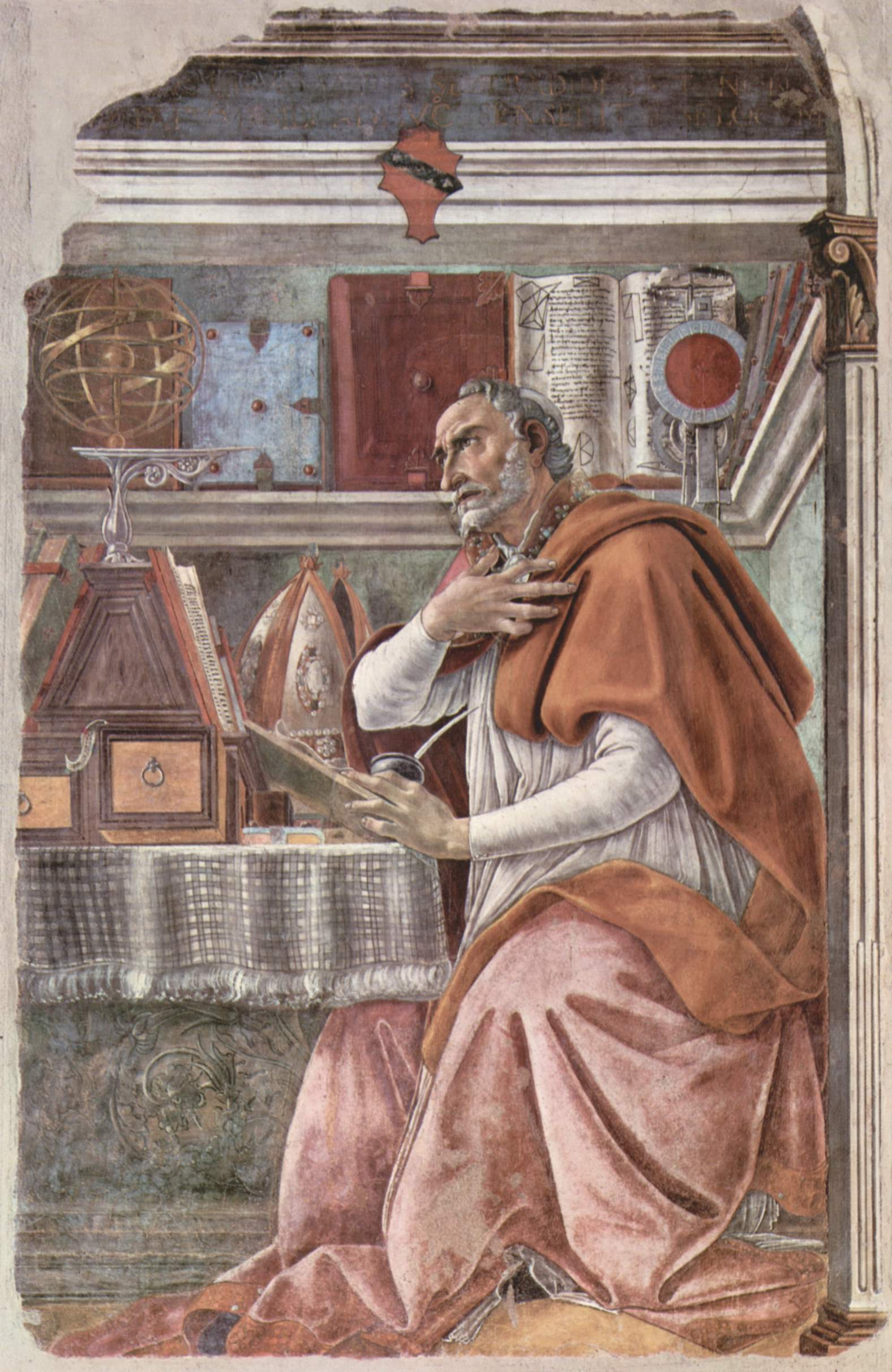
Augustine of Hippo, by Sandro Botticelli

Year 430 (CDXXX) was a common year starting on Wednesday of the Julian calendar. At the time, it was known as the Year of the Consulship of Theodosius and Valentinianus (or, less frequently, year 1183 Ab urbe condita). The denomination 430 for this year has been used since the early medieval period, when the Anno Domini calendar era became the prevalent method in Europe for naming years.

== Events ==
=== By place ===
==== Roman Empire ====
- Spring – The Vandals under King Genseric extend their power in North Africa along the Mediterranean Sea, and lay siege to Hippo Regius (where Augustine has recently been bishop).
- Aetius puts an end to the Gothic revolt of Anaolsus, not far from Arles; Anaolsus is taken prisoner.
- April - Aetius defeats the Juthungi during his campaign in the Alps.
- May - Flavius Felix, his wife and a deacon are accused of plotting against Aetius. They are arrested in Ravenna and executed. Aetius is granted the title of patricius (Roman nobility).
- The Huns led by Octar attack the Burgundians, who occupied territory on the Rhine near the city of Worms (Germany). During the fighting Octar dies, and his army is destroyed.

==== Asia ====
- Feng Ba abdicates as emperor of the Northern Yan, one of the states vying for control of China. He is succeeded by his brother Feng Hong.

=== By topic ===
==== Religion ====
- August 28 – Augustine dies during the siege of Hippo Regius at age 75, leaving behind his monumental work The City of God and other works that will have influence on Christianity.
- Saint Patrick reaches Ireland on his missionary expedition (approximate date).
- Peter the Iberian founds a Georgian monastery near Bethlehem.

== Births ==
- Asclepigenia, Athenian philosopher and mystic (d. 485)
- Julius Nepos, Western Roman Emperor (d. 480)
- Marcia Euphemia, Roman Empress (approximate date)
- Sidonius Apollinaris, bishop and diplomat (approximate date)
- Syagrius, Roman official and son of Aegidius
- Victor Vitensis, African bishop (approximate date)
- Xiao Wu Di, emperor of the Liu Song dynasty (d. 464)

== Deaths ==
- May – Flavius Felix, Roman consul
- August 28 – Augustine of Hippo, bishop and theologian (b. 354)
- Abdas, bishop of Susa
- Saint Aurelius, bishop of Carthage (approximate date)
- Feng Ba, emperor of the Chinese state Northern Yan
- Nilus of Sinai, bishop and saint (approximate date)
- Octar, Hunnic ruler (approximate date)
- Plutarch of Athens, Greek philosopher
