= Siege of Massilia (413) =

Military battle in 413

Date	413
Location	Massilia, Gallia Narbonensis 43.29°N 5.37°E
Result	Roman victory

Belligerents
Visigoths	Western Roman Empire

Commanders and leaders
Ataulf	Bonifacius

Strength
Unknown	Unknown

Casualties and losses
Unknown	Unknown

The siege of Massilia was made by the Visigoths against the Roman city of Massilia, Gallia Narbonensis in 413. Campaigning in southern Gaul, the Visigothic king Ataulf had taken Toulouse and Narbonne and laid siege of Massilia. The city was defended by the capable Roman general Bonifacius. Ataulf failed to take Massilia, and later made peace with Emperor Honorius. Marrying Honorius' sister Galla Placidia. Ataulf was thereafter sent to recover Hispania for the empire.

== Sources ==
- Jaques, Tony (2007). Dictionary of Battles and Sieges: F-O. Greenwood Publishing Group. ISBN 978-0313335389.
