= Vandal War (439–442) =

Conflict between Western Roman Empire and Vandals (439–442)

- Part of the Fall of the Roman Empire and Roman–Germanic Wars
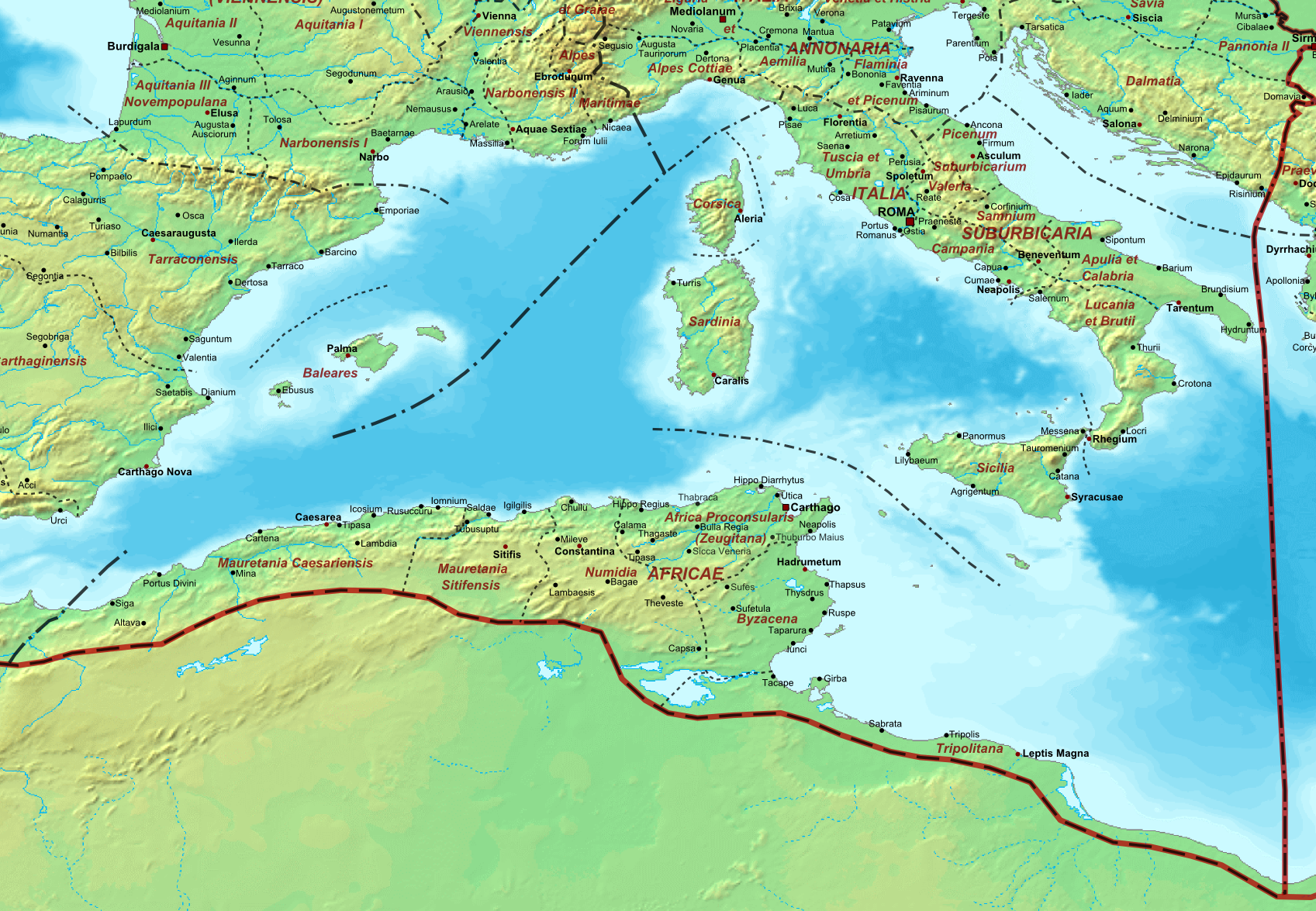
- Map of Africa and Italy
Date	439–442 AD
Location	Italy
Result	Indecisive; Treaty of 442

Belligerents
Vandals; Alans	Western Roman Empire; Eastern Roman Empire

Commanders and leaders
Geiseric; Hunerik; Gento	Flavius Aetius; Sebastianus; Areobindus, Ansila en Germanus

Strength
Unknown	Unknown

The Vandal War (439–442) was a military conflict between the Western Roman Empire and the Vandals that was fought in the western Mediterranean Sea region. The main protagonists in this conflict were the Vandal king Geiseric and the commander-in-chief of the Roman army Aetius.

== Sources ==
Little is known about the course of this war and the battles that took place. Only in broad outlines can the course of the war be reconstructed, for there is not a single complete report of the battles that happened. The little that has been written down is based on fragments of chroniclers and occasional references from poets, rhetoricians and theologians. The main source about the events are Prosper and Hydatius. Furthermore, Cassiodorus and Jordanes provide useful information.

== Background ==
A few years before, the Vandals led by Geiseric had crossed from Spain to North-Africa, which period is known as the Vandal conquest of Roman Africa. This conquest ended in a stalemate, because none of the parties involved achieved the final victory. Finally, in 435 a peace settlement was reached in which the Vandals distanced themselves from the Roman provinces Mauretania Tingitana, Mauretania Caesariensis and Numidia. In return, they were assigned Africa, the richest part of the Roman province Africa Proconsularis, agreeing to the status of foederati of the Romans.

== The war ==
=== Reason ===
After signing the peace in 435, Geiserics' ambition for more power had not disappeared. In peace he prepared for a new war. When it became clear to him that Aetius, the commander-in-chief of the Roman army, had to focus all his attention to preserve Gaul, first by defeating the Burgundy uprising in 436 and then holding his hands full at the Gothic War, Geiseric decided it was time to realize his plans.

=== The conquest of Carthage ===
Overview of the Battleground

Geiseric had defeated the Roman army in Africa twice, once in the battle of Calama against Bonifatius and twice when it was reinforced by troops from the east, so the trust must have been great with him. It is almost certain that the eastern troops had returned home with Aspar in 439. Moreover, it is not known whether the troops that Bonifatius brought to Italy in the civil war to confront Aetius were ever sent back to Africa. Consequently, it is clear that Geiserik had to deal with a weak army in Africa, but an army that could be strengthened from Italy if the war against the Goths were to be won.

In mid-October 439 Geiseric violated the peace treaty with the Romans by invading the Roman province Byzacena without a declaration of war. Carthago, the third largest city of the Romans, was taken on October 19, 439 without any struggle. As a result, part of the Mediterranean Sea Fleet fell into the hands of the Vandals. In Italy, this news caused the necessary fear, as the cities of Rome and Naples were brought into a state of defense and Sigiswult, master of soldiers, took steps to guard the shores. Aetius and his army were called from Gaul and the emperor Theodosius II was prepared to send help.

=== The attack on Sicily ===
Geiseric may have been aware that preparations had been made against him in Italy, because after the conquest of Carthage he concentrated his attack on Sicily, where he besieged Panormus. He failed to conquer the city, but burned the island and possibly, although not certainly, occupied the city Lilybaeum. In the eastern part of the Roman Empire, considerable preparations were made to go to war against the Vandals. Because of this threat, Geyseric returned his fleet to Africa in 440. Prosper attributes his return to Africa to an attack on Carthage by Sebastianus (the son-in-law of Boniface), who attacked Africa from Spain. This Sebastianus may have been commissioned by Theodosius.

=== The Roman Counterattack ===
The following year Theodosius had prepared a large naval squadron sailing westward, with the aim of freeing Carthage from the Vandals. Prosper writes that the imperial fleet was commanded by three generals, Areobindus, Ansila and Germanus This expedition arrived in Sicily in 441 after which the island was purged of Vandals. Awaiting the Imperial Fleet, Geyseric sent negotiators to talk about peace. This diplomatic consultation took a lot of time, and in the meantime an invasion of the Huns forced Theodosius to bring back his fleet. So the emperors were limited to make a detrimental peace.

== Peace negotiations ==
Eventually, a new peace treaty was concluded in 442. The Treaty of 442 replaced the old treaty of 435 and divided Africa again between the two powers. For the Vandals it was more advantageous, the Western Roman Empire retained the provinces of Tripolitania, Mauretania sitifensis, Mauretania Caesariensis and parts of Numidia, while the Vandals were allowed to call themselves masters of the rest of that province and whole Africa Proconsularis including Byzacena.

Aetius had every interest in the West having good relations with Geiseric, in order to prevent him from having a pretext for attacks on Sicily, or Sardinia, or Italy itself. It is suspected that he managed to persuade Valentinianus to agree to the engagement between his eldest daughter Eudocia, and the son of Geyseric Hunerik. It is very likely that this arrangement was already considered at the time of the drafting of the treaty. But Hunerik was already married to the daughter of the Visigothic king Theodoric I. Nevertheless, the existing marriage to the Gothic Princess was no obstacle. A pretext to get rid of her was easy to find. The princess was accused of wanting to poison Geiseric. She was punished for this by mutilation of her face, without ears and nose she was sent back to her father. The incident produced an immortal enmity between these kings. Theoderic I soon sought a new ally by marrying another daughter to Rechiar, king of the Suebi (449).

== Aftermath and consequence ==
For the Romans, the ceding of the rich province of Africa Proconsularis was a great bloodletting. The West lost its grain deliveries from Africa, but even more importantly also the tax revenues, with which it, among other things, financed its expensive army of military forces. It is not known whether the Treaty of 442 also provided for a scheme to provide Italy with grain. Nevertheless, it is assumed that these were continued. It was clearly in the interest of the new owners to send the grain surplus to the Italian markets.

After the conquest of Carthage, most landowners who were part of the Roman senatorial class were forced to leave the coasts of Africa, some sailed to Italy, others sought refuge in the east. In the other parts of his empire Geiseric does not seem to have taken such extreme measures. He thought it was enough to make the royal capital and the central province safe.

== Primary Sources ==
- Hydatius
- Prosper
- Victor Vitensis
- Cassiodorus
- Jordanes

== Biography ==
- Bury, J.B. (1923). "Settlement of the Vandals in Africa (A.D. 435‑442)". History of the Later Empire.
- Hughes, Ian (2012). Aetius: Attila's Nemesis, Chapter 9 the Fall of Africa. Pen & Sword Military. ISBN 978-1848842793.
