= Sebastianus (magister militum) =

Roman general

Sebastianus (died before 445 or in 450) was a general of the Western Roman Empire, son-in-law of Bonifacius.

A good soldier and advisor, and an orthodox Catholic, Sebastianus was son-in-law of the powerful Bonifacius, comes Africae in 420s, nominated magister militum praesentalis and patrician by the Empress Galla Placidia in 432. The elevation of Bonifacius disturbed another influential general of the empire, the magister militum praesentalis Flavius Aetius, who had fought and won several campaigns in Gaul; fearing that the promotion of Bonifacius to such an elevated rank (Aetius was not a patrician) would have brought his own dismissal, Aetius took the initiative and attacked Bonifacius, who won the Battle of Ravenna (432) but died from the wounds received.

Sebastianus took the office previously kept by his father-in-law. In the meantime, Aetius fled first to his country estates, then to Rome and, through Dalmatia and Pannonia, reached the Huns, who were his friends (Aetius had spent some years, as a boy, at the Hunnic court as a hostage). When, in 433, Aetius entered Italy with a large Hunnic army, it was clear who was to win the encounter: Sebastianus was deposed and fled to Constantinople, seeking refuge at the Eastern court. Here he obtained the support of influential members of the court; he allowed his supporters to start remunerative pirate activities in Hellespont and Propontis.

Prosper reports that Sebastianus carried out an attack on the Vandals at the time of the Vandal War of 439-442 from Spain with a fleet. Sebastianus may have act on behalve of the eastern emperor Theodosius II, that time.

In 444, as result of some plots, he was obliged to flee the Eastern court; he reached the Visigothic court of Theodoric I and, from there, he went to Barcelona. Being declared a public enemy by the Romans, he decided to pass from Spain to Africa, where he was welcomed by the Vandal king Geiseric, who, at the beginning, kept Sebastianus as advisor, but later put him to death (450).

A different timeline of the events puts his departure from Constantinople in 435, his arrival in Africa in 440 and his death before 445.

== See also ==
- Roman civil war of 432

Military offices
Preceded by Bonifacius	Magister militum of the Western Roman Army; 432-433	Succeeded by Aetius
