= Sanoeces =

Hun general

Sanoeces Dux
- Born: Late 4th or early 5th century Pannonia
- Died: 427; Carthage

Sanoeces (died 427) was a Hun military leader serving as general under the Western Roman Empire.

== History ==
He took part in Felix's Civil War with Bonifatius, being one of the three chief generals of the expedition, the others being the Romans Mavortius and Gallio. The three led siege together to Bonifatius in Carthage. However, they turned against each other, and then Sanoeces and his Huns killed the Romans before he was in turn killed, which ended the siege.

== Etymology ==
His name is Hunnic and is comparable to similar names later repeatedly recorded among the Turkic-speaking Bulgars.
