= 379 =

379 in various calendars
- Gregorian calendar: 379; CCCLXXIX
- Ab urbe condita: 1132
- Assyrian calendar: 5129
- Balinese saka calendar: 300–301
- Bengali calendar: −215 – −214
- Berber calendar: 1329
- Buddhist calendar: 923
- Burmese calendar: −259
- Byzantine calendar: 5887–5888
- Chinese calendar: 戊寅年 (Earth Tiger); 3076 or 2869 — to — 己卯年 (Earth Rabbit); 3077 or 2870
- Coptic calendar: 95–96
- Discordian calendar: 1545
- Ethiopian calendar: 371–372
- Hebrew calendar: 4139–4140
- Hindu calendars
- Vikram Samvat: 435–436
- Shaka Samvat: 300–301
- Kali Yuga: 3479–3480
- Holocene calendar: 10379
- Iranian calendar: 243 BP – 242 BP
- Islamic calendar: 251 BH – 249 BH
- Javanese calendar: 261–262
- Julian calendar: 379; CCCLXXIX
- Korean calendar: 2712
- Minguo calendar: 1533 before ROC 民前1533年
- Nanakshahi calendar: −1089
- Seleucid era: 690/691 AG
- Thai solar calendar: 921–922
- Tibetan calendar: ས་ཕོ་སྟག་ལོ་ (male Earth-Tiger); 505 or 124 or −648 — to — ས་མོ་ཡོས་ལོ་ (female Earth-Hare); 506 or 125 or −647

Year 379 (CCCLXXIX) was a common year starting on Tuesday of the Julian calendar. At the time, it was known as the Year of the Consulship of Ausonius and Hermogenianus (or, less frequently, year 1132 Ab urbe condita). The denomination 379 for this year has been used since the early medieval period, when the Anno Domini calendar era became the prevalent method in Europe for naming years.

== Events ==
=== By place ===
==== Roman Empire ====
- January 19 – Emperor Gratian elevates Flavius Theodosius at Sirmium, giving him the title Augustus with power over all the eastern provinces. Theodosius comes to terms with the Visigoths and settles them in the Balkans as military allies (foederati).
- Gratian refuses the title of Eastern Emperor.
- Gratian renounces the title Pontifex Maximus.
- Britain is forced to endure fierce Barbarian raids.

==== Europe ====
- Niall becomes High King of Ireland.

==== Persia ====
- King Shapur II, ruler of the Persian Empire, age 70, dies after a 69-year reign in which he conquered Armenia and transferred multitudes of people from the western lands to Susiana (Khuzistan). The great town Nishapur in Khorasan (eastern Parthia) is also founded by him. His brother Ardashir II, governor-king of Adiabene, is placed by the nobles on the throne.

==== China ====
- Former Qin captures the city of Xiangyang from Eastern Jin. The Buddhist monk Dao'an is transferred from Xiangyang to Chang'an.

==== Mesoamerica ====
- September 12 – Yax Nuun Ayiin (I) becomes ruler of Tikal.

=== By topic ===
==== Religion ====
- Gregory Nazianzus becomes Patriarch of Constantinople, and is wounded when he is attacked by a mob of heretics.
- John Chrysostom writes a book on the Christian education of children.

== Births ==
- Gunderic, king of the Vandals and Alans (d. 428)
- Wang Hong, Chinese politician and general (d. 432)

== Deaths ==
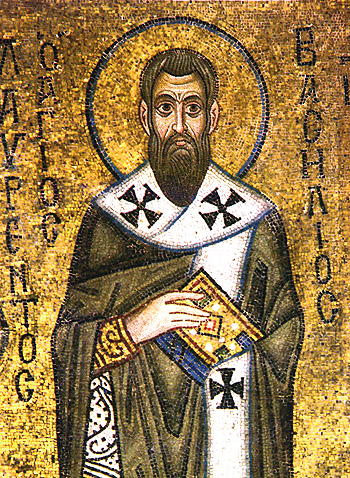
Saint Basil the Great

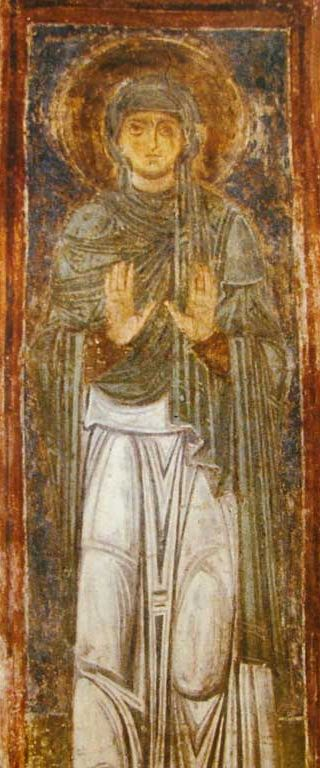
Saint Macrina the Younger

- January 1 – Basil ("the Great"), bishop of Caesarea Mazaca (b. 330)
- July 19 – Macrina the Younger, Christian nun and saint (b. 327)
- Shapur II ("the Great"), ruler of the Sasanian Empire (b. 309)
