= Battle of Rimini (432) =

432 battle between Bonifacius and Flavius Aetius

Coordinates: 44°25′N 12°12′E

Battle of Ravenna (Or Remini)
- Part of Roman civil war of 432
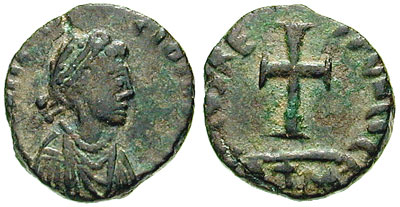
- Galla Placidia, wife of Constantius III and mother of Valentinian III.
Date	432 AD
Location	Near Rimini, present-day Italy
Result	Bonifacius victorious, but mortally wounded

Commanders and leaders
Bonifacius (DOW)	Flavius Aetius

Strength
Less than 7,000 Bucellarii	Less than 7,000 Bucellarii

Casualties and losses
About 2,000	Low

The Battle of Rimini was fought in 432 between the two strong men of the Western Roman Empire, the very recently deposed Magister Utriusque Militiae Flavius Aetius and the newly appointed Magister Utriusque Militiae Bonifatius (Bonifacius or Boniface).

In 430, Aetius had the Magister Utriusque Militiae Flavius Constantius Felix executed by the army, as he was allegedly plotting against Aetius. According to Wijnendaele, Aetius was lured into confronting Bonifatius by being appointed Consul in 432, where he was deposed and Bonifatius appointed by Galla Placidia. Aetius and Bonifatius then departed the court of Ravenna, gathered their bucellarii, and met five Roman miles outside of Rimini. Aetius had brought his own troops from the West where he had intended to confront the Sueves, while Bonifatius had brought part of his troops from Africa, most likely being composed of his personal bucellarii and local Italian troops. Allegedly, Aetius had a longer lance and utilized it to spear Bonifatius in personal combat during the battle. Bonifatius, though victorious, was mortally wounded during the battle and died several months later. He was succeeded by his son-in-law, Sebastian, who tried to have the retired Aetius assassinated. Aetius fled to the Huns and returned possibly with a large army of Huns. Sebastian, who was unpopular with the army and the court, was exiled and Aetius quickly became the de facto manager of the Western Roman Empire.
