= 431 =

431 in various calendars
Gregorian calendar	431; CDXXXI
Ab urbe condita	1184
Assyrian calendar	5181
Balinese saka calendar	352–353
Bengali calendar	−163 – −162
Berber calendar	1381
Buddhist calendar	975
Burmese calendar	−207
Byzantine calendar	5939–5940
Chinese calendar	庚午年 (Metal Horse); 3128 or 2921 — to — 辛未年 (Metal Goat); 3129 or 2922
Coptic calendar	147–148
Discordian calendar	1597
Ethiopian calendar	423–424
Hebrew calendar	4191–4192
- Hindu calendars
Vikram Samvat	487–488
Shaka Samvat	352–353
Kali Yuga	3531–3532
Holocene calendar	10431
Iranian calendar	191 BP – 190 BP
Islamic calendar	197 BH – 196 BH
Javanese calendar	315–316
Julian calendar	431; CDXXXI
Korean calendar	2764
Minguo calendar	1481 before ROC 民前1481年
Nanakshahi calendar	−1037
Seleucid era	742/743 AG
Thai solar calendar	973–974
Tibetan calendar	ལྕགས་ཕོ་རྟ་ལོ་ (male Iron-Horse); 557 or 176 or −596 — to — ལྕགས་མོ་ལུག་ལོ་ (female Iron-Sheep); 558 or 177 or −595

Year 431 (CDXXXI) was a common year starting on Thursday of the Julian calendar. At the time, it was known as the Year of the Consulship of Bassus and Antiochus (or, less frequently, year 1184 Ab urbe condita). The denomination 431 for this year has been used since the early medieval period, when the Anno Domini calendar era became the prevalent method in Europe for naming years.

== Events ==
=== By place ===
==== Roman Empire ====
- Aetius campaign in the Alps: Flavius Aetius, Roman general (magister militum), fights the rebellion in Rhaetia (Switzerland) and Noricum (Austria). He is attested in the city of Vindelicia (modern Augsburg), reestablishing Roman rule on the Danube frontier.
- Aetius pushes the Salian Franks back across the River Somme. King Chlodio signs a peace treaty and becomes a foederatus of the Western Roman Empire.

==== Africa ====
- Hippo Regius becomes the capital of the Vandal Kingdom. After 14 months of hunger and disease, the Vandals ravage the city. Emperor Theodosius II sends an imperial fleet with an army under command of Aspar, and lands at Carthage.
- Aspar is routed by the Vandals and Flavius Marcian, future Byzantine emperor, is captured during the fighting. He negotiates a peace with King Genseric and maintains imperial authority in Carthage.

==== Central America ====
- March 10 – Kʼukʼ Bahlam I, the first known ruler of the Mayan city-state of Palenque (the modern-day state of Chiapas in southern Mexico) comes to power and reigns until his death four years later.
- Possible date of the Tierra Blanca Joven (TBJ) eruption of the Ilopango caldera in central El Salvador.

=== By topic ===
==== Arts and Sciences ====
- Greek Neoplatonist philosopher Proclus begins studying at the Academy in Athens.

==== Religion ====
- June – First Council of Ephesus: Nestorianism is rejected; the Nicene Creed is declared to be complete. Nestorius is deposed from his see.
- October 1 – Maximianus is enthroned as Patriarch of Constantinople.
- Pope Celestine I dispatches Palladius to serve as bishop to the Irish.

== Births ==
- Anastasius I, emperor of the Byzantine Empire (approximate date)
- Odoacer, first "barbarian" king of Italy (d. 493)

== Deaths ==
- June 22 – Paulinus of Nola, Christian bishop and poet (b. 354)
- Qifu Mumo, prince of the Chinese Xianbei state Western Qin
