= The Parting of Lot and Abraham =

Mosaic in Santa Maria Maggiore, Rome

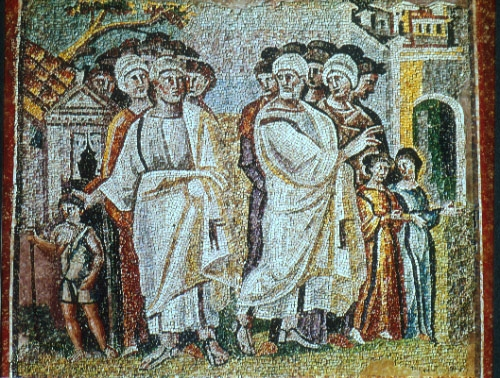
The Parting of Lot and Abraham mosaic from Santa Maria Maggiore

The Parting of Lot and Abraham is one in a series of mosaic scenes, probably dating to the 430s, decorating the nave wall of Santa Maria Maggiore, one of the most prominent basilican churches in Rome. The mosaic shows the story in the Book of Genesis of the parting of Abraham from his nephew, Lot, as they choose opposing paths. Abraham (on the left), with Isaac and the rest of his family, chooses the road to Canaan, as God intends him to, and Lot chooses to take his followers to Sodom.

The work is a tessera mosaic, tessera describing the material making up the surface of the work. Most tessera works during this time would be made up of small pieces of limestone or marble, cut to shape, and arranged by the artist. The artist uses several conventions of the time. The grouping of the characters is varied, meant to create the illusion of space. This "shorthand" way of depicting a crowd is sometimes called a "head cluster". There is a hieratic abandonment of consistent and realistic proportions and scale, allowing the artist to put emphasis on the characters of his choosing using attributes like size. The main characters we are intended to focus on are made extremely clear through this method, and the picture itself becomes less illustrative and more symbolic. Eventually, this style comes to refined maturity during the Middle Ages. The move towards completely two-dimensional representative images has already started, and although this mosaic implements the use of lights and darks, with shadows corresponding to the figures, there is a good indication as to what direction religious art is heading.
