= Helion (magister officiorum) =

Helion (Ancient Greek: Ἡλίων) was a magister officiorum under Theodosius II. He occupied the office since 414. In 422 he negotiated an end to the short war with Sassanid Persia.

He was instrumental in establishing Valentinian III as emperor of the Western Roman Empire, proclaiming him caesar at Thessalonica on 23 October 424, and to full augustus in Rome by placing the diadem on his head on 23 October 425, after the defeat of the usurper Joannes. In between the two events, he acquired the title patricius.

== Works cited ==
- Heather, Peter (2005). The Fall of the Roman Empire: A New History. London: Macmillan.
- Martindale, John R., ed. (1980). The Prosopography of the Later Roman Empire: Volume II, AD 395–527. Cambridge: Cambridge University Press. ISBN 0-521-20159-4.
