= Bucellarii =

Roman Empire escort troops

Bucellarii (the Latin plural of bucellarius; literally "biscuti-eaters", Ancient Greek: Βουκελλάριοι, Boukellarioi) were formations of escort troops used in the Roman Empire in Late Antiquity. (Note: They are also described as "militarily organized bodyguards" or "elite defence forces".) They were employed by high-ranking military figures (such as Flavius Aetius and Belisarius) or civil office-holders. Their name is derived from the type of bread rations eaten by these troops, so-called buccellatum. The term bucellarii came into common use during the reign of Emperor Honorius (r. 395–423).

According to Jon Coulston, one bucellarii regiment is attested in the Notitia Dignitatum. The creation of the bucellarii reflected an increase in the "use of armed retinues by public officials" in the Roman Empire. These armies were, therefore, associated with the decline of imperial authority because they demonstrated that it no longer had the monopoly of violence. The bucellarius had close ties with its commander, supporting him in his quarrel with other commanders and even against the Empire, court, and emperor. This is shown by the army of Heraclian, which was used in his attempt to seize Roman Italy from Emperor Honorius.

Coulston notes that the bucellarii provided the best cavalry in 5th and 6th century Roman armies, and were "recruited from Romans, Persians, Goths, and Huns, amongst others". The recruitment of soldiers of barbarian origin is well-documented as evidenced in the description of the army inherited by Constantius' widow Galla Placidia. The poet Claudian also described the bucellarii as an army of barbarians under the employ of military figures, politicians, and warlords such as Stilicho, Aetius, and the praetorian prefect Rufinus.

The bucellarii generally received the highest salaries and were armed with the best equipment from the empire's factories. Some sources state that the bucellarii were mercenaries and describe their leaders as soldiers of fortune. This was particularly the case for the military companies that operated in Italy from the sixth to seventh centuries.

== Equipment and combat tactics ==
Unlike standard Late Roman limitanei or comitatenses infantry who were primarily armed as heavy spearmen, bucellarii were overwhelmingly equipped as elite hybrid cavalry. Drawing inspiration from Eurasian nomadic tactics and Hunnic mercenary contingents, a bucellarius was trained to be proficient with both the heavy thrusting lance (kontos) and the composite recurve bow. They wore heavy scale or mail armor and carried small shields. This combination allowed Late Roman commanders like Belisarius and Flavius Aetius to employ them flexibly — either as long-range horse archers to soften enemy formations or as shock cavalry to deliver decisive flank charges.

== See also ==
- Bucellarian Theme
- Ka'ak

== General and cited sources ==
- Coulston, Jon (2018). "bucellarii". In Nicholson, Oliver (ed.). The Oxford Dictionary of Late Antiquity. Oxford: Oxford University Press. ISBN 978-0-19-866277-8.
- Dixon, Karen R.; Southern, Pat (1996). Late Roman Army. Routledge. ISBN 978-1134724222.
- Heather, Peter (2018). Rome Resurgent: War and Empire in the Age of Justinian. Oxford University Press. ISBN 9780199362745.
- Prinzing, Günter (2008). "Patronage and retinues". In Jeffreys, Elizabeth; Haldon, John F.; Cormack, Robin (eds.). The Oxford Handbook of Byzantine Studies. Oxford University Press. ISBN 978-0199252466.
