= Bonifatius =

Roman general (d. 432)

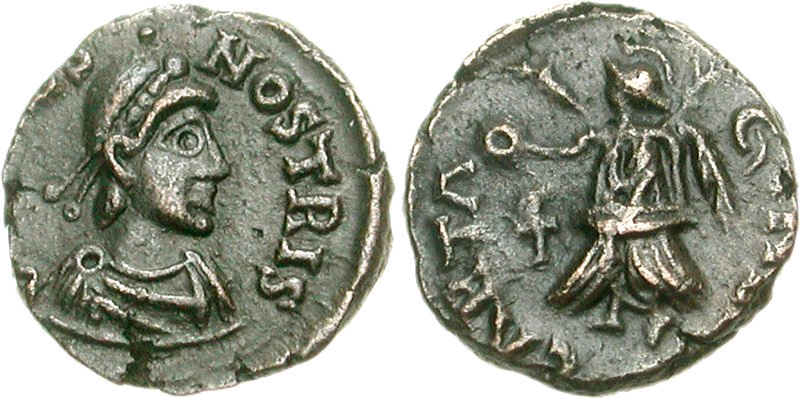
Coin of Bonifatius Comes Africae (422–431 AD).

Bonifatius (or Bonifacius; also known as Count Boniface or Comes Bonifacius; died 432) was a Roman general and governor of the diocese of Africa. He campaigned against the Visigoths in Gaul and the Vandals in North Africa. An ally of Galla Placidia, mother and advisor of Valentinian III, Bonifacius engaged in Roman civil wars on her behalf against the generals Felix in 427–429 and Aetius in 432. Although he defeated the latter at the Battle of Rimini, Bonifacius suffered a fatal wound and was succeeded by his son-in-law Sebastianus as patricius of the Western Roman Empire.

== Biography ==
=== Early career ===
Bonifatius first appears as a general of Constantius III in 413, where he defeated the Visigoths of Athaulf at Massilia; he allegedly threw a weapon and wounded the Gothic king himself. Later that decade, Bonifatius was known to be a tribunus commanding a Gothic regiment of foederati in North Africa campaigning against the Mauri, and had a friendship with St. Augustine of Hippo with whom he discussed theological matters. In 422 he was likely recalled to the Western court in Ravenna, where he probably married his Gothic wife Pelagia, daughter of Beremudus, and inherited her father's bucellarii. Bonifatius and Castinus then prepared to launch a campaign against the Vandals and Alans in Spain, but Bonifatius' forces never arrived as the two commanders had quarreled constantly since its inception. Galla Placidia sought to prevent Castinus from gaining the position of Stilicho before him, and as a result Castinus attempted to remove Bonifatius from power. Bonifatius retreated to North Africa where he acquired the command of comes africae under dubious circumstances and continued his campaigns against the Mauri tribes. After the death of Emperor Honorius the primicerius notariorum Joannes was elevated to the throne by Castinus in 424, and Bonifatius responded by cutting off the Grain supply from North Africa, showing his support for the Theodosians (Placidia and Theodosius II).

Prosper states that Joannes' forces were weakened because they were campaigning against Bonifatius in North Africa, but were unable to depose him like in the campaigns against Gildo and other North African usurpers. After a revolt in Gaul and a military campaign under the eastern generals Ardabur and Aspar sent by Theodosius II, Joannes was overthrown, and Valentinian III, half-nephew of Honorius, was made Western emperor by the magister officiorum Helion. Bonifatius supported him, and resumed the grain shipments to Rome, being rewarded the position of comes domesticorum in return.

=== Civil War with Felix ===
In 427, Bonifatius was recalled to Ravenna by Placidia, but refused the summons. Bonifatius was accused of attempting to form his own empire in Roman Africa at the allegation of Flavius Constantius Felix, who had also been a staunch supporter of Placidia and had been installed as the magister utriusque militiae of the west by Theodosius II. Placidia ordered Felix to send an army to restore the vital province in response. Felix's generals for the expedition included Mavortius, Gallio, and Sanoeces. Mavortius and Gallio led Roman forces proper, while Sanoeces commanded the Hun Foederati troops. Together the three generals laid siege to Bonifatius at Carthage. The three besiegers, however, turned on each other, and Sanoeces and his Huns killed the Romans before he was killed himself, which lifted the siege. When news reached Ravenna, Felix sent the Comes Sigisvultus against Bonifacius, who campaigned with his Goths in Africa for two years. Sigisvultus captured Carthage, but Bonifatius and his Gothic bucellarii continued to campaign in Numidia, where they were allowed to loot the province. Bonifatius also had his daughter baptized by an Arian priest, which caused a falling out between him and St. Augustine. However, Placidia sent an envoy to Bonifatius in 429, from which she learned that a letter had been forged ordering him not to return to Ravenna if summoned. A man named Darius was sent to negotiate a truce between Bonifatius and Sigisvultus, and as a result Bonifatius was restored to Placidia's favor and the civil war ended in time to face the Vandal threat.

=== Campaigns against the Vandals ===
Some sources report that Bonifatius invited the Vandals to Africa, though doubt has been cast on this in recent years. The Vandals crossed near Roman Tingis, and an inscription at Altava dated to 429 mentions the deceased was wounded by a "barbarian" during the Vandal advance across Africa. Their campaign was briefly halted by Darius, who negotiated a brief truce, but Gaiseric quickly resumed. Bonifatius, the African army, and a contingent of supporting Gothic foederati confronted and were defeated by Gaiseric near the city of Calama in 430, after which Bonifatius retreated to the city of Hippo Regius. In May or June of 430, Gaiseric laid siege to the city, and St. Augustine died during the siege, which was finally lifted in July or August of 431. Leaving it at the mercy of Gaiseric, Bonifatius retreated out of the city to join his forces with the Eastern Roman general Aspar, who had been sent to reinforce Africa by Theodosius II. In early 432, Bonifatius and Aspar engaged Gaiseric in battle, but were again defeated. Allegedly, the future emperor Marcian was captured in this engagement, but released after Gaiseric had a vision of him becoming Emperor.

=== Civil war with Aetius and death ===
In 432, after Flavius Felix, his wife Padusia, and a deacon had been hanged by the Roman army, allegedly at the instigation of Flavius Aetius whose power she sought to resist, Placidia appointed Bonifatius magister utriusque militiae and patricius of the west, despite his unsuccessful record in Africa. Bonifacius led his forces against Aetius and the Gallic army at the Battle of Rimini in 432. Bonifacius and his son-in-law Sebastianus were victorious, and Aetius was allowed to retire to his private estates, although Bonifatius was mortally wounded by a lance during the conflict. He died sometime between a few days and three months after the battle. Sebastianus, appointed to fill his place, attempted to have Aetius assassinated, only for Aetius to flee to the court of the Huns and return with their support. Allegedly Sebastianus was preparing to fight Aetius by summoning the Visigoths to his aid, but he was evidently unpopular among the troops and allowed them to engage in piracy, and had lost support in the court as well. Sebastianus was exiled, and as a result Aetius became the dominant power in the Western Roman Empire, and married Bonifacius' widow Pelagia allegedly at his request.

Military offices
Preceded by Felix; In 430	Magister militum of the Western Roman Army; 431–432	Succeeded by Sebastianus; In 433
