= Felix (consul 428) =

Roman general

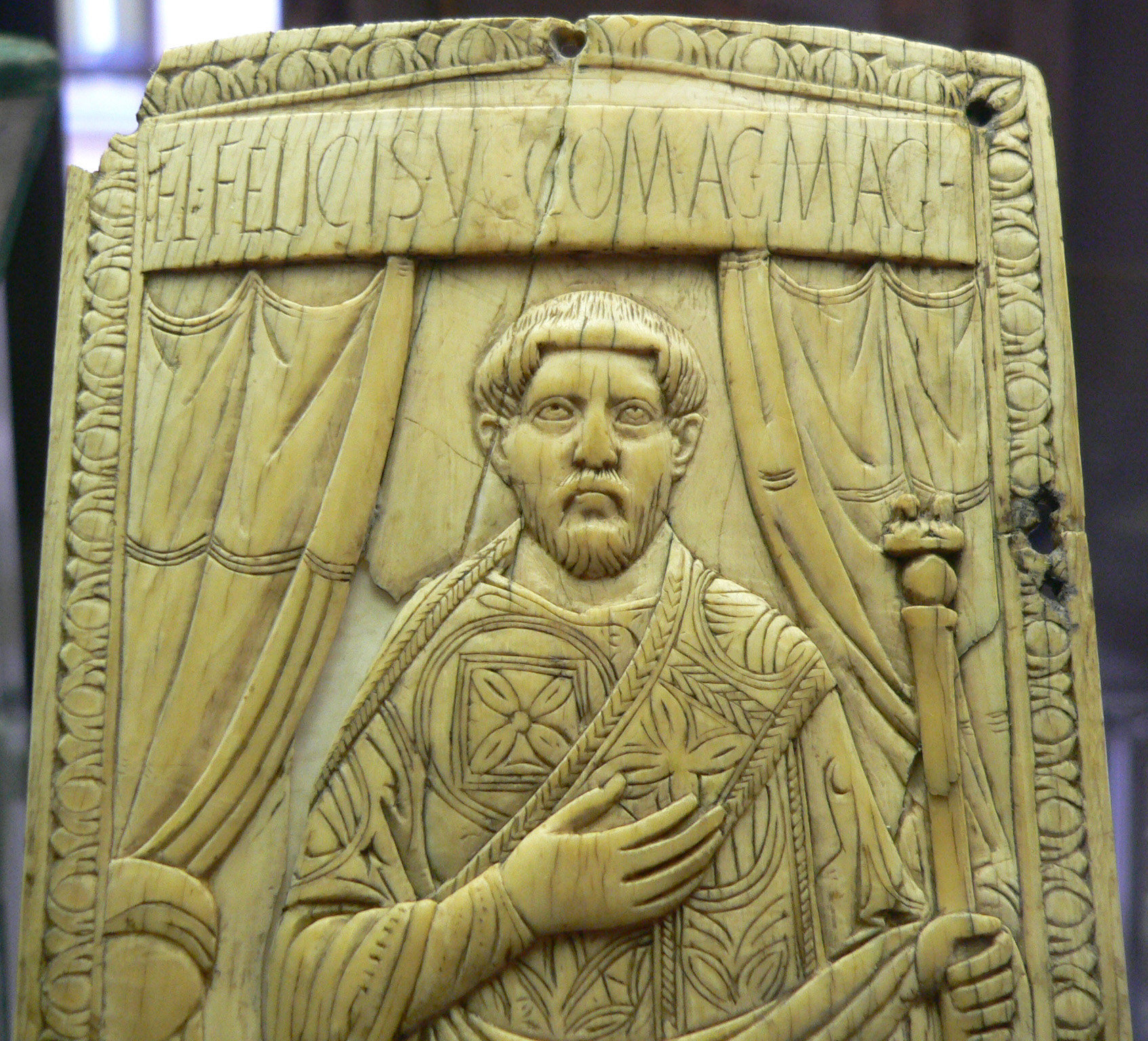
Left leaf of the consular diptych of Flavius Felix

Flavius Felix (died 430), sometimes erroneously called Constantius Felix, was a general of the Western Roman Empire, who reached the prominent rank of patrician before being killed probably by order of Aetius. For his consulate in 428 he issued some consular diptychs, one of which is extant.

== History ==
=== Career ===
Felix served during the reign of emperors Valentinian III and Theodosius II. Between 425 (the year in which he was made patricius) and 429 he served as magister utriusque militae in defense of Italy, but despite a brief mention of one of his military actions in the Notitia Dignitatum, his subordinates Bonifacius and Aetius were considered more significant in this regard.

In the forcefield in which Felix was living, there was constant intrigue, rivalry and murder. In Ravenna, a powerful ruler was missing, because the emperor Valentinian III was a minor and the empire was ruled by his mother Galla Placidia. The empress-mother was guided by her advisers: in addition to Felix, the generals Bonifacius and Aetius also vied for her favors. Felix was not indifferent, in 426 he ordered the death of Patroclus, bishop of Arelate, and of Titus, deacon in Rome. There was a great rivalry between him and Aetius. In 429, Felix seems to be overshadowed by Aetius. Although he acquires the pretentious function of patricius in 430, he seems to have lost his grip on the army when Aetius is appointed by Galla Placida as magister equitum praesentalis, an equivalent military rank.

=== Magister militium ===
Between 425 and 429, Felix was the most important soldier in the west. During that period there was a major uprising among the Visigoths in Gallia and Hispania. He mainly stood in Italy and left the control of his armies to the younger and ambitious generals Bonifacius and Aetius. We must attribute to Felix the reorganization of the defenses of the Danube provinces in 427-428 (for which we find evidence in the Notitia dignitatum).

== Rebellion of Boniface ==
When Bonifacius revolted in Northern Africa in 427, Felix sent some troops to this province commanded by three generals: Mavortius, Gallio and Sanoeces. This force was defeated by the troops loyal to Bonifacius. Following this, Felix sent a new force to Africa under the command of the Gothic general Sigisvult.

== Rivalry with Aetius ==
The promotion of Felix by Galla Placidia to patrician in 430 cannot be seen as a reward for his efforts to neutralize the danger that Boniface posed (which was actually a failure), but to prevent even more envy by the growing power of Aetius who was now equivalent in rank. There had been rivalry between the generals for some time. It is believed that Aetius deliberately kept himself away during the civil war against Boniface by campaigning against the Franks. Evidence that he was actively involved in the civil war is lacking.

=== Conspiracy and murder ===
We see the same pattern as the imperial government orders Aetius to cease the campaign in Gaul, to go with his troops to Italy to prepare with Felix in the war against the Vandals. Aetius refused to supply troops and instead campaigned in Noricum against the rebellious population. The main evidence of this lies in the timing of the murders and Aëtius immediate route thereafter. Aetius had Felix murdered, around the same time the Vandals had cornered Boniface's troops.

Felix, his wife Padusia and a deacon named Grunnitus were murdered in May 430 in Basilica Ursiana in Ravenna. Priscus suggests Felix was accused of plotting against Aetius with the emperor's mother Galla Placidia and was killed by order of Aetius himself.

== Consulate ==
His carved ivory consular diptych is notable for depicting his clothing in great detail. The diptych survived intact until the French Revolution, when the right leaf was stolen; it is now believed lost.

According to a recent reconstruction of his familial bonds, he was an ancestor of Arcadius Placidus Magnus Felix, consul in 511, and a son of Ennodius. Born about 380 he might have been the man who was the husband of a daughter (born 385) of Agricola, consul in 421 and perhaps the father of Emperor Avitus, being the parents of Magnus, consul in 460 and Felix Ennodius, proconsul in Africa in about 420 or 423.

== Bibliography ==
- A. H. M. Jones; J. R. Martindale; J. Morris (1980). "Fl. Constantius Felix 14". The Prosopography of the Later Roman Empire. Vol. 2. Cambridge University Press. p. 251. ISBN 978-0-521-20159-9.
- Bagnall, Roger S.; Cameron, Alan; Schwartz, Seth R.; Worp, Klaas A. (1987). Consuls of the Later Roman Empire. Philological Monographs No. 36. American Philological Association. p. 390. ISBN 1-55540-099-X.
- Wijnendaele, Jeroen P. (2017). "The early career of Aëtius and the murder of Felix (c. 425-430 CE)". Historia: Zeitschrift für Alte Geschichte. 66 (4): 468–482. JSTOR 45019274.

Political offices
| Preceded by Hierius and Ardabur | Roman consul 428, with Taurus | Succeeded by Florentius and Dionysius |
Military offices
| Preceded by Castinus | Magister militum of the Western Roman Army; 425–430 | Succeeded by Bonifacius; In 431 |
