= Galla Placidia =

Roman empress in 421

- Augusta
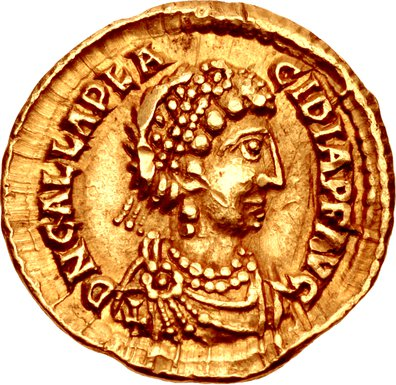
- Tremissis of Galla Placidia

Roman empress
- Tenure: 421
- Born: 392/93
- Died: 27 November 450 (aged 57–58)
- Burial: Rome (she is not buried in the Mausoleum of Galla Placidia, Ravenna)
- Spouse: Ataulf; Constantius III
- Issue: Theodosius; Justa Grata Honoria; Valentinian III
- Dynasty: Theodosian and Valentinianic
- Father: Theodosius I
- Mother: Galla
- Religion: Nicene Christianity

Galla Placidia (392/93 – 27 November 450), daughter of the Roman emperor Theodosius I, was a mother, tutor, and advisor to emperor Valentinian III. She was queen consort to Ataulf, King of the Visigoths, from 414 until his death in 415, briefly empress consort to Constantius III in 421, and managed the government administration as a regent during the early reign of Valentinian III until her death.

== Family ==
Placidia was the daughter of Theodosius I and his second wife, Galla, who was herself daughter of Valentinian I and his second wife, Justina. Galla Placidia's date of birth is not recorded, but she must have been born either in the period 388–89 or 392–93. Between these dates, her father was in Italy following his campaign against the usurper Magnus Maximus, while her mother remained in Constantinople.

A surviving letter from Bishop Ambrose of Milan, dated 390, refers to a younger son of Theodosius named Gratianus, who died in infancy; as Gratianus must have been born in the period 388–89, it is most probable that Galla Placidia was born during the second period, 392–93. Placidia's mother Galla died some time in 394, perhaps giving birth to a stillborn son.

Placidia was a younger, paternal half-sister of emperors Arcadius and Honorius. Her older half-sister Pulcheria predeceased her parents according to Gregory of Nyssa, placing the death of Pulcheria prior to the death of Aelia Flaccilla, the first wife of Theodosius I, in 385. Coins issued in Placidia's honour in Constantinople after 425 give her name as AELIA PLACIDIA; this may have been intended to integrate Placidia with the eastern dynasty of Theodosius II. There is no evidence that the name Aelia was ever used in the west, or that it formed part of Placidia's official nomenclature.

== Early life ==
Placidia was granted her own household by her father in the early 390s and was thus financially independent while underage. She was summoned to the court of her father in Mediolanum (Milan) during 394, and was present at Theodosius's death on 17 January 395. She was granted the title of "nobilissima puella" ("most noble girl") during her childhood.

Placidia spent most of her early years in the household of Stilicho, foremost military officer in the West, and his wife, Serena. She is presumed to have learned weaving and embroidery. She might have also been given a classical education. Serena was a first cousin of Arcadius, Honorius and Placidia. The poem "In Praise of Serena" by Claudian and the Historia Nova by Zosimus clarify that Serena's father was an elder Honorius, a brother to Theodosius I. According to "De Consulatu Stilichonis" by Claudian, Placidia was betrothed to Eucherius, only known son of Stilicho and Serena. Her scheduled marriage is mentioned in the text as the third union between Stilicho's family and the Theodosian dynasty.

Arcadius died in 408 and was succeeded by his son Theodosius II. In August of the same year, Honorius's courtiers convinced him to depose and execute Stilicho, leading to a weakening of the state. Eucherius, who had sought refuge in Rome, was also killed.

== Residence with the Visigoths ==
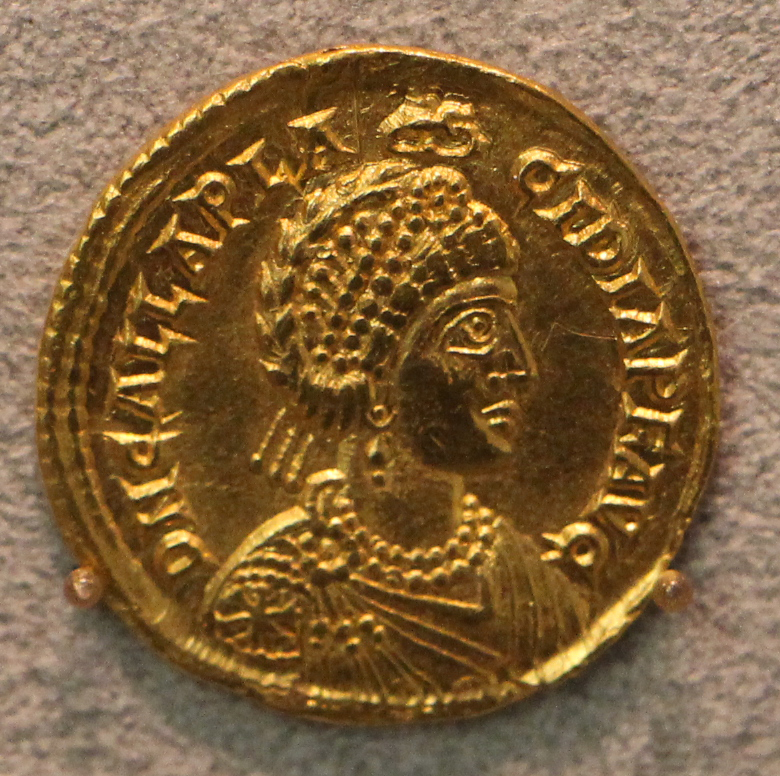
Coin of 422

In the disturbances that followed the fall of Stilicho, wives and children of foederati living in the cities of Italy were killed. Most of the foederati, regarded as loyal to Stilicho, joined the forces of Alaric I, King of the Visigoths. Alaric led them to Rome and put it under siege, with minor interruptions, from autumn 408 to 24 August 410. Zosimus records that Placidia was within the city during the siege. When Serena was accused of conspiring with Alaric, the whole senate and Placidia sentenced her to death.

Placidia was captured by Alaric before the fall of Rome, and accompanied the Visigoths from Italy to Gaul in 412. Their ruler Ataulf, having succeeded Alaric, entered an alliance with Honorius against Jovinus and Sebastianus, rival Western Roman emperors located in Gaul, and managed to defeat and execute both in 413. After this victory, Ataulf cemented his improved relations with Honorius by marrying Galla Placidia at Narbonne on 1 January 414. The nuptials were celebrated with high Roman festivities and magnificent gifts. Priscus Attalus gave the wedding speech, a classical epithalamium. The marriage was recorded by Hydatius and Jordanes, although the latter states that it was earlier, in 411 at Forum Livii (Forlì) (possibly a more informal event).

Placidia and Ataulf had one son, Theodosius, born in Barcelona by the end of 414, but the child died early in the following year, eliminating an opportunity for a Romano-Visigothic line; years later the corpse was exhumed and reburied in the imperial mausoleum in Old St. Peter's Basilica, Rome. In August or September of 415, Ataulf was killed in Hispania. The assassin, a servant identified as "Dubius" or "Eberwolf", was avenging his former master Sarus the Goth, who had died fighting under Jovinus and Sebastianus.

The Amali faction proceeded to proclaim Sigeric, a brother of Sarus, as the next king of the Visigoths. Ataulf's six children from a former marriage were killed, and his widow Galla Placidia was forced to walk more than twelve miles on foot among the crowd of captives driven ahead of the mounted Sigeric. After 7 days of ruling, Sigeric was assassinated and replaced with Wallia, Ataulf's relative.

== Marriage to Constantius III and the papal succession crisis ==
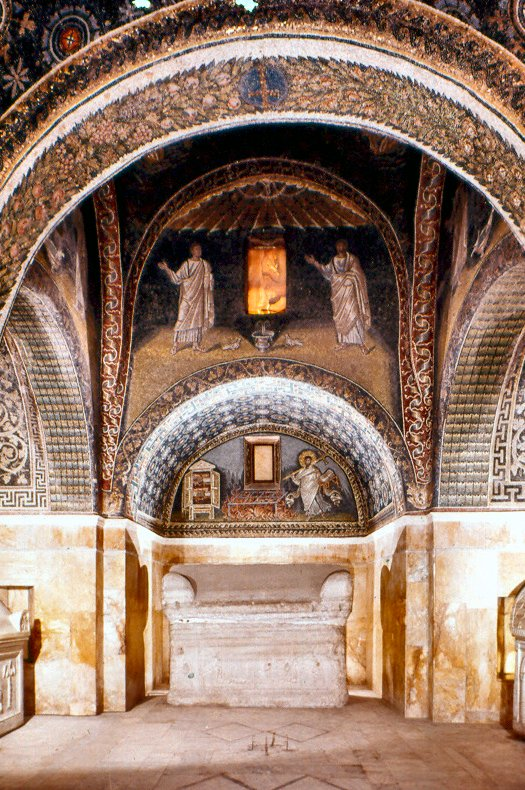
Interior of the Mausoleum of Galla Placidia in Ravenna

According to the Chronicon Albeldense, included in the Códice de Roda, Wallia was desperate for food supplies. He surrendered to Constantius III, at the time magister militum of Honorius, negotiating terms giving foederati status for the Visigoths. As part of the peace treaty, Placidia was returned to Honorius, who forced her to marry Constantius III on 1 January 417. Their daughter Justa Grata Honoria was probably born in 417 or 418. The history of Paul the Deacon mentions her first among the children of the marriage, suggesting that she was the eldest. Their son Valentinian III was born 2 July 419.

Placidia intervened in the succession crisis following the death of Pope Zosimus on 26 December 418. Two factions of the Roman clergy had plunged the city into tumult by electing rival successors, Eulalius (elected 27 December) and Boniface I (elected 28 December). Symmachus, Prefect of Rome, wrote to the court at Ravenna, requesting an imperial decision on the matter. Placidia and, presumably, Constantius petitioned the emperor in favor of Eulalius. This was arguably the first intervention by an Emperor in the Papal election.

The controversy persisted after Honorius confirmed Eulalius as the legitimate pope, and a synod of Italian bishops, meeting at Ravenna from February to March 419, also failed to reach a conclusion. In the meantime, the two rival popes were ordered to leave Rome. Soon before Easter, Eulalius forfeited the imperial favor by making an unauthorized return to the city and attempting to take possession of the Basilica of Saint John Lateran. Boniface was proclaimed the legitimate pope as of 3 April 419, returning to Rome a week later. Honorius called a second synod in May, this time including attendees from Gaul and Africa. Placidia personally wrote to summon the African bishops; three of her letters are known to have survived.

On 8 February 421, Constantius was proclaimed an Augustus, becoming co-ruler with the childless Honorius. Placidia was proclaimed an Augusta. She was the only Empress in the West, since Honorius had divorced his second wife Thermantia in 408 and had never remarried. Neither title was recognised by Theodosius II, the Eastern Roman Emperor. Constantius reportedly complained about the loss of personal freedom and privacy that came with the imperial office. He died of an illness on 2 September 421.

== Widowhood and civil war ==
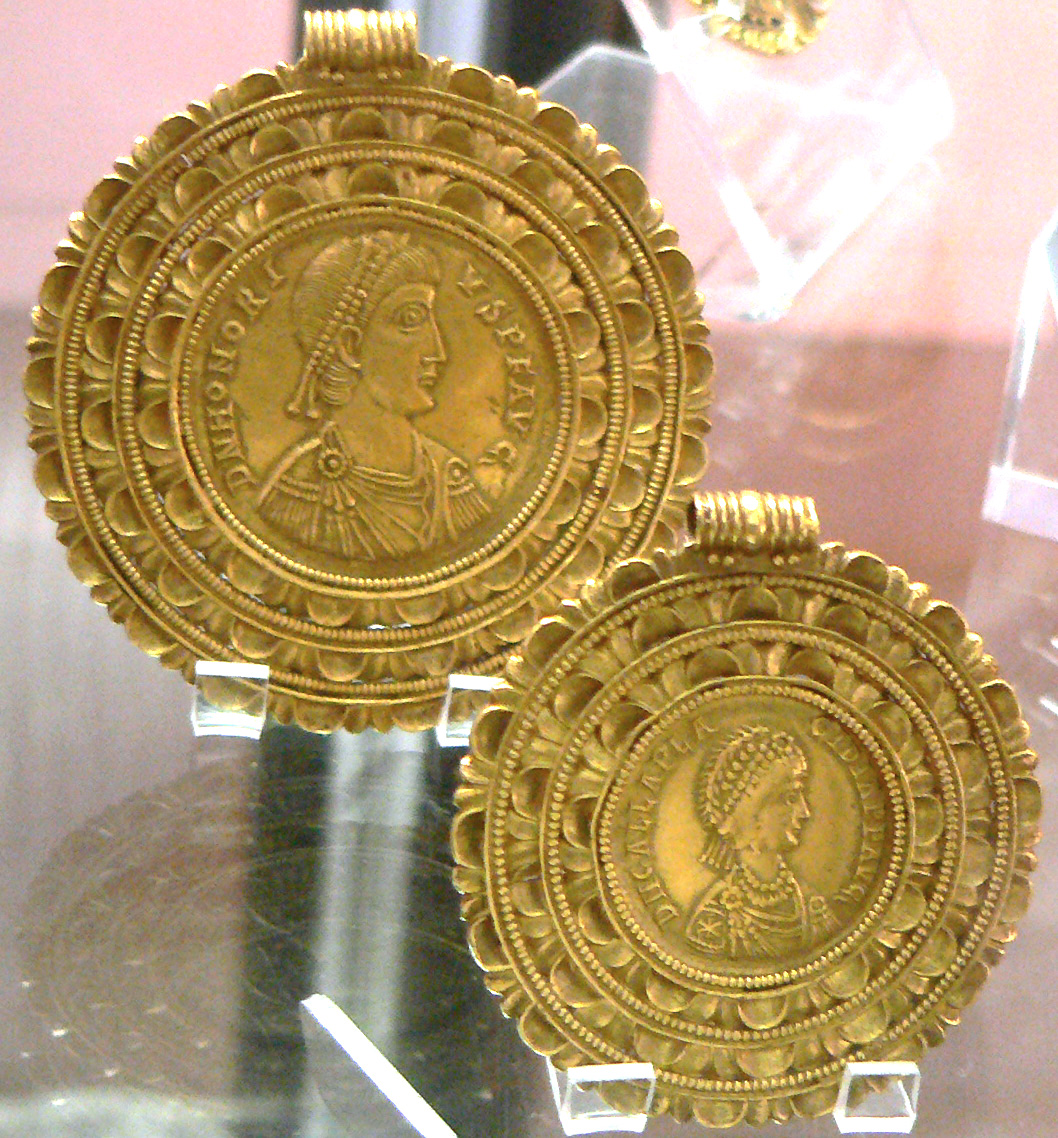
Medallions of Honorius and Galla Placidia, Ravenna, 425

According to Olympiodorus of Thebes, a historian used as a source by Zosimus, Sozomen and probably Philostorgius, the public grew suspicious of the increasingly scandalous public caresses she was said to have received from her own brother Honorius after her husband's death. However, the siblings' relationship suddenly turned hostile, and around this time, she may have plotted against him. After her soldiers clashed with those of Honorius, Galla Placidia herself was now forced to flee to Constantinople with her children. Despite this setback, Bonifacius, governor of the Diocese of Africa continued to be loyal to her.

Placidia, Valentinian, and Honoria arrived in Constantinople around 422/423. On 15 August 423, Honorius died of edema, perhaps pulmonary edema. With no member of the Theodosian dynasty present at Ravenna to claim the throne, an official named Joannes was made Western Roman Emperor without the approval of Theodosius II. Joannes's rule was accepted in the provinces of Italia, Gaul and Hispania, but not in the province of Africa.

Theodosius II reacted by preparing Valentinian III to take Joannes's place. In 423/424, Valentinian was named nobilissimus. In 424 he was betrothed to Licinia Eudoxia, his first cousin once removed and the daughter of Theodosius II and Aelia Eudocia. At the same time, forces of the Eastern Roman army, under the general command of Ardaburius, invaded Italy by land and sea. Placidia and Valentinian traveled with Ardaburius's son Aspar, commander of the land forces. Along the way, Valentinian was proclaimed Caesar by Helion, a magister officiorum under Theodosius, on 23 October 424. Ardaburius, whose fleet had been dispersed by a storm, was captured by loyalist forces and imprisoned in Ravenna. He convinced some of his captors to defect to Theodosius's side and to summon Aspar, who took the city after a siege. Joannes was publicly executed in Aquileia.

Valentinian was officially proclaimed the new Augustus of the Western Roman Empire on 23 October 425, by Helion, in the presence of the Roman Senate, with Theodosius II's support. Three days after Joannes's death, his ally Flavius Aetius belatedly arrived with an army of Huns from across the Danube. After some skirmishing, Placidia, Valentinian and Aetius came to an agreement and established peace. The Huns were paid off and sent home, while Aetius received the position of comes and magister militum per Gallias (commander-in-chief of the Roman army in Gaul).

== Regent ==
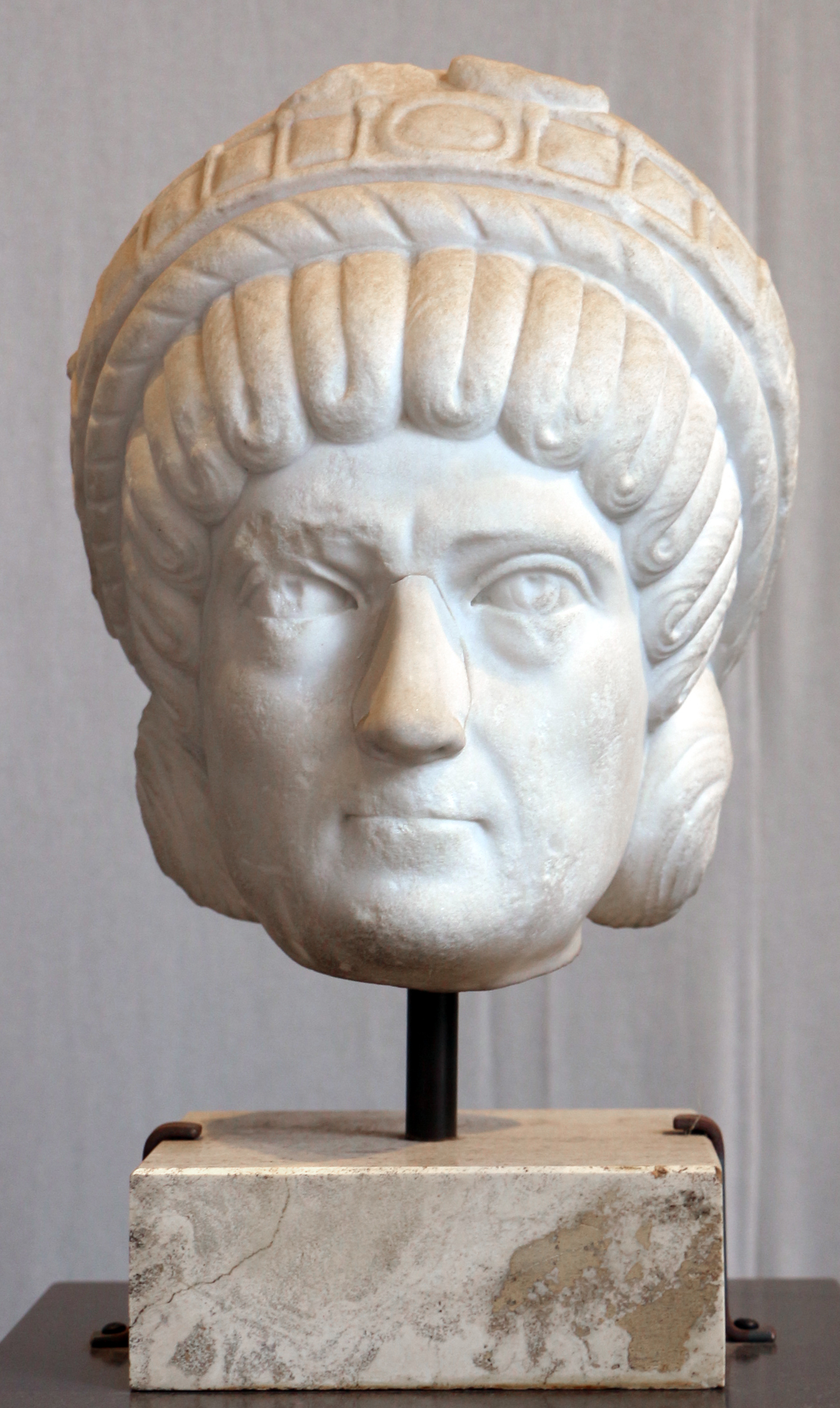
Possible portrait in Museo dell'Alto Medioevo, Rome

Galla Placidia became a regent of Western Roman Empire for her son, Valentinian, in 425 until Aetius's rise. Among her early supporters were Bonifacius and Felix. The latter was assassinated in 430, possibly by Aetius.

=== Conflict between Bonifacius and Aetius ===
Conflict between Placidia and Bonifacius started in 429. Procopius records that Aetius played the two against each other, advising Placidia that Bonifacius should be recalled to Rome as a dubious character, then writing to Bonifacius, warning him that Placidia was about to summon him for no good reason in order to put him away.

Bonifacius trusted the warning from Aetius and refused the summons; thinking his position untenable, he sought an alliance with the Vandals, who crossed from Spain into Libya to join him. Friends of Bonifacius in Rome, finding his apparent act of hostility toward the Empire entirely out of character, traveled to Carthage at Placidia's behest to intercede with him. He showed them the letter from Aetius, whose contents they communicated to Placidia. She did not move against Aetius, as he wielded great influence, and as the Empire was already in danger; but she urged Bonifacius to return to Rome "and not to permit the empire of the Romans to lie under the hand of barbarians."

Bonifacius now regretted his alliance with the Vandals and tried to persuade them to return to Spain. Gaiseric offered battle instead, and Bonifacius was besieged at Hippo Regius in Numidia by the sea (Augustine of Hippo was its bishop and died in this siege). Unable to take the city, the Vandals eventually raised the siege. The Romans, with reinforcements under Aspar, renewed the struggle but were routed and lost Africa to the Vandals.

Bonifacius had meanwhile returned to Rome, where Placidia raised him to the rank of patrician and made him "master-general of the Roman armies". Aetius returned from Gaul with an army of "barbarians", and was met by Bonifacius in the bloody Battle of Ravenna (432). Bonifacius won the battle, but was mortally wounded and died a few days later. Aetius was compelled to retire to Pannonia.

=== Rise of Aetius ===
With the generals loyal to her having either died or defected to Aetius, Placidia acknowledged Aetius's political role as legitimate. In 433, Aetius was given the titles magister militum and "patrician". The appointments effectively left Aetius in control of the entire Western Roman army and gave him considerable influence over imperial policy. Aetius later played a pivotal role in the defense of the Western Empire against Attila. Placidia continued to act as regent until 437, though her direct influence over decisions was diminished. She would continue to exercise political influence until her death in 450—no longer, however, the only power at court.

During these years, Galla Placidia befriended bishop Peter Chrysologus, both having a shared interest in building churches. She also befriended a certain Barbatianus, whom she met in Rome. He came to Ravenna to be her confessor. According to his later biography, through his intercession she miraculously obtained a sandal of John the Evangelist for the church she had built to honour the saint. When Barbatianus died, Placidia and Chrysologus arranged his burial.

Placidia joined the rest of the imperial family in forcing her daughter, Justa Grata Honoria, into an unwanted political marriage. In the spring of 450 Honoria wrote for help to Attila, who chose to interpret the message as a marriage proposal and asked for half of the western Empire as dowry. Valentinian denied the legitimacy of the proposal, and only the influence of Placidia dissuaded him from executing his sister. Instead Honoria was quickly married to Flavius Bassus Herculanus, though this did not prevent Attila from pressing his claim.

Placidia died shortly afterwards at Rome, in November 450, and was buried in the Theodosian family mausoleum adjacent to Old St. Peter's Basilica, later in the chapel of Saint Petronilla in that Basilica.

== Public works ==
Being a devout Christian, she was involved in the building and restoration of various churches throughout her period of influence. She restored and expanded the Basilica of Saint Paul Outside the Walls in Rome and the Church of the Holy Sepulchre in Jerusalem. She built San Giovanni Evangelista, Ravenna, in thanks for the sparing of her life and those of her children in a storm while crossing the Adriatic Sea. The dedicatory inscription reads "Galla Placidia, along with her son Placidus Valentinian Augustus and her daughter Justa Grata Honoria Augusta, paid off their vow for their liberation from the danger of the sea."

Another monument in Ravenna, one of the UNESCO World Heritage Sites inscribed in 1996, is known as the Mausoleum of Galla Placidia. However, the building never served as her tomb, but was initially erected as a chapel dedicated to Lawrence of Rome. It is unknown whether the sarcophagi therein contained the bodies of other members of the Theodosian dynasty, or when they were placed in the building.

== In literature ==
- Two stanzas in Alexander Blok's poem "Ravenna" (May–June 1909) focus on her tomb; Olga Matich writes: "For Blok, Galla Placidia represented a synthetic historical figure that linked different cultural histories."
- Ezra Pound uses her tomb as an exemplar of the "gold" remaining from the past, for example in Canto XXI: "Gold fades in the gloom,/ Under the blue-black roof, Placidia's..."
- Louis Zukofsky refers to it in his poem "4 Other Countries", reproduced in "A" 17: "The gold that shines/ in the dark/ of Galla Placidia,/ the gold in the// Round vault rug of stone/ that shows its pattern as well as the stars/ my love might want on her floor..."
- Carl Jung refers to Galla Placidia in his autobiography Memories, Dreams, Reflections, (Chapter IX, Section 'Ravenna and Rome'). He reports a vision of "four great mosaic frescoes of incredible beauty" he experienced in the Neonian Baptistery right after visiting Galla's tomb at Ravenna. He had been, he says, "personally affected by the figure of Galla Placidia" and goes on to say: "Her tomb seemed to me a final legacy through which I might reach her personality. Her fate and her whole being were vivid presences to me". Jung was later surprised to discover that the mosaics he and an acquaintance remembered had actually never existed.
- Galla Placidia is a major supporting character in R. A. Lafferty's semi-historical work The Fall of Rome, which introduces her as "the goblin child and sister of the two young emperors who, at the age of seventeen, and when all the rest of them were cowed, seized control of the Roman Senate and the City and represented the defiance in the last one hundred days of the world."

== In popular culture ==
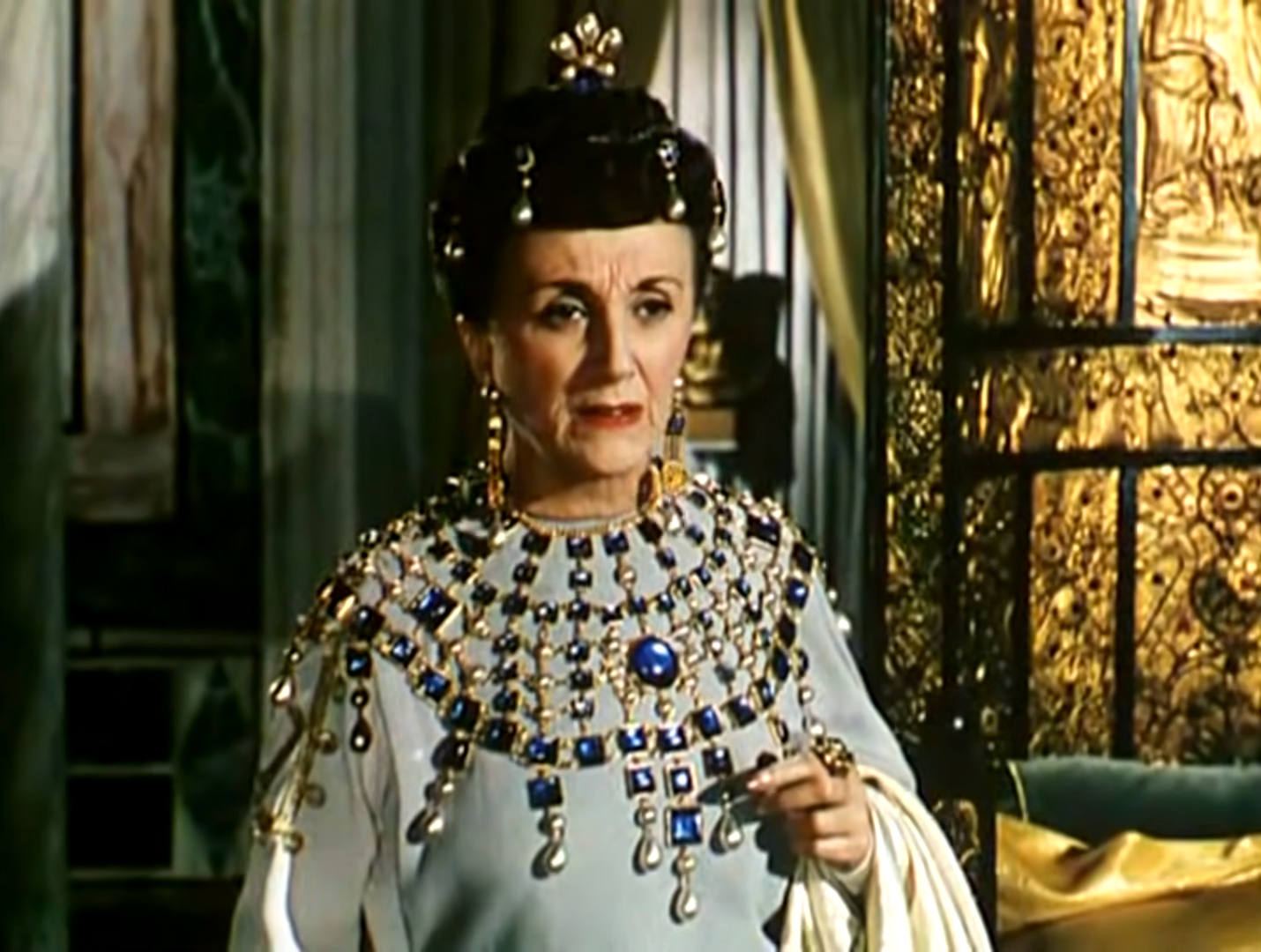
Galla Placidia portrayed by Colette Régis in Attila

- Galla Placidia is represented in the BBC's Ancient Rome: The Rise and Fall of an Empire by Natasha Barrero.
- Spanish musician Jaume Pahissa wrote the opera Galla Placídia in 1913.
- Galla Placidia is played by Colette Régis in the 1954 film Attila.
- Galla Placidia is played by Alice Krige in the 2001 American TV miniseries Attila.

== Notes ==
Royal titles
Preceded by Thermantia	Western Roman empress consort 421	Succeeded by Licinia Eudoxia
