= List of conflicts between Romans and Persians =

The following is a list of wars fought between Romans and Iranians.

Roman/Byzantine victory
Parthian/Sasanian victory
Inconclusive

Date	War	Belligerents		Result	Notes
Date	War	Romans	Iranians	Result	Notes
54–50 BCE	First of the Roman–Persian Wars	Roman Empire	Parthian Empire	Stalemate	Roman invasion of 54 BCE under Crassus culminates in defeat at the Battle of Carrhae in 53 BCE. Subsequent Parthian invasion of 51 BC under Pacorus I is repelled with their defeat in Syria following the Siege of Antioch (51 BC).
40–38 BCE	Pompeian–Parthian invasion	Roman Empire	Parthian Empire	Roman victory	Status quo ante bellum: Beginning of Antony's Atropatene campaign
36–20 BCE	Antony's Atropatene campaign	Roman Empire	Parthian Empire	Parthian victory	Status quo ante bellum: Beginning of Antony's campaign against Armenia
58–63 CE	Roman–Parthian War	Roman Empire	Parthian Empire	Inconclusive	Treaty of Rhandeia
115–117 CE	Trajan's Parthian campaign	Roman Empire	Parthian Empire	Inconclusive	Romans annex Mesopotamia for a brief time period and Adiabene, Roman withdrawal after death of Trajan.
161–166 CE	Roman–Parthian War	Roman Empire	Parthian Empire	Roman victory	Arsacids re–establish themselves on the Armenian throne as Roman clients Ctesiphon and Seleucia sacked Rome has minor acquisitions in Mesopotamia
198 CE	Roman–Parthian War of 194–198	Roman Empire	Parthian Empire	Roman victory	Resulted in the sack of Ctesiphon following defeat of Vologases V and annexation of Mesopotamia and Osrhoene to the Empire.
216–217 CE	Parthian war of Caracalla	Roman Empire	Parthian Empire	Parthian victory	Status quo ante bellum: Romans are forced to pay tribute
229–233 CE	First Mesopotamian campaign of Ardashir I	Roman Empire	Sasanian Empire	Inconclusive	Both sides scored victories
237–238 CE	Second Mesopotamian campaign of Ardashir I	Roman Empire	Sasanian Empire	Sasanian victory	Roman forces defeated
242–244 CE	Sasanian campaign of Gordian III	Roman Empire	Sasanian Empire	Sasanian victory	Philip the Arab pays 500,000 denarii to the Sasanian Empire and cedes Armenia and Mesopotamia; Death of Gordian III
252–256 CE	Shapur I's Invasion of Rome's Eastern Provinces	Roman Empire	Sasanian Empire	Sasanian victory	Sasanian invasion resulting in the sack of Antioch and the plunder of numerous Roman territories and capture of slaves. Limited territorial gains.
259–260 CE	Shapur I's second invasion of Rome's Eastern Provinces	Roman Empire	Sasanian Empire	Sasanian victory	Roman Emperor Valerian captured at the Battle of Edessa.
261–266 CE	Odaenathus' Sasanian Campaigns	Roman Empire	Sasanian Empire	Disputed	The importance of this campaign is disputed: while some sources say it was a total defeat for the Persian forces during their withdrawal from Roman territories, others say it was a skirmish or a minor incident turned by Roman historians and their modern successors into repeated routings of Shapur by an ally of Rome.
283 CE	Carus' Sasanian Campaign	Roman Empire	Sasanian Empire	Inconclusive	Withdrawal of the Roman forces
296–298 CE	Galerius' Sasanian Campaigns	Roman Empire	Sasanian Empire	Roman victory	The Sasanians pay up 400,000 denarii to Rome
337–361 CE	Perso-Roman wars of 337–361	Roman Empire	Sasanian Empire	Inconclusive	The Romans under Constantius II were defeated in several sanguinary encounters, however, Shapur was unable to secure a decisive victory.
363 CE	Julian's Persian expedition	Roman Empire	Sasanian Empire	Sasanian victory	Sasanians annex five regions and fifteen major fortresses from the Roman Empire along with the consequent annexation of Armenia
363–371 CE	Armeno-Sassanid War of 363–371	Roman Empire	Sasanian Empire	Roman victory	Persians depose Arshak II of Armenia Armenia is put under Roman suzerainty through Pap of Armenia entronization.
421–422 CE	Roman–Sasanian War	Roman Empire	Sasanian Empire	Stalemate	Status quo ante bellum
440 CE	Byzantine–Sasanian War of 440	Byzantine Empire	Sasanian Empire	Inconclusive	Status quo ante bellum: Both empires agree to battle northern nomads (Scythians)
502–506 CE	Anastasian War	Byzantine Empire	Sasanian Empire	Inconclusive	Status quo ante bellum: Rome made some payments to the Sasanian Empire
526–532 CE	Iberian War	Byzantine Empire	Sasanian Empire	Inconclusive	Sasanians retained Iberia, Byzantines retained Lazica
541–562 CE	Lazic War	Byzantine Empire	Sasanian Empire	Disputed	Fifty–Year Peace Treaty: No clear winner emerged from the conflict, however, the Sasanian Empire held a slight advantage since Rome was required to pay a set amount to Persia annually.
572–591 CE	Byzantine–Sasanian War of 572–591	Byzantine Empire	Sasanian Empire	Byzantine victory	Khosrow II is restored to the Sasanian throne, Byzantine Empire gets most of Persian Armenia and the western half of Iberia
602–628 CE	Byzantine–Sasanian War of 602–628	Byzantine Empire	Sasanian Empire	Byzantine victory	Status quo ante bellum: Political and economic crisis of the Sassanids; Beginning of the Arab conquests; The Sasanian Empire pays for all the damage
