= Siege of Pavia =

Siege of Pavia can refer to one of the following sieges of the city of Pavia (ancient Ticinum) in Italy:

- Siege of Pavia (476), by Odoacer
- Siege of Pavia (489–490), by Tufa
- Siege of Pavia (569–572), by the Lombards
- Siege of Pavia (755), by Pippin the Short
- Siege of Pavia (773–774), by Charlemagne
- Siege of Pavia (924) during the Hungarian invasions of Europe
- Siege of Pavia (1302), by the Visconti
- Siege of Pavia (1315), by the Visconti
- Siege of Pavia (1356), by the Visconti
- Siege of Pavia (1359), by the Visconti
- Siege of Pavia (1522) during the Italian War of 1521–1526
- Siege of Pavia (1524–1525) during the Italian campaign of 1524–1525
- Siege of Pavia (1527), by the League of Cognac
- Siege of Pavia (May 1528) during the War of the League of Cognac
- Siege of Pavia (September 1528) during the War of the League of Cognac
- Siege of Pavia (1655) during the Franco-Spanish War (1635-1659)
- Siege of Pavia (1706) during the War of the Spanish Succession

== See also ==
- Battle of Pavia (disambiguation)
