= Siege of Rhodes =

Siege of Rhodes may refer to one of the following sieges of the island of Rhodes:

- Siege of Rhodes (305–304 BC), by Demetrius I of Macedon
- Siege of Rhodes (88 BC), siege by Mithridates VI of Pontus in the First Mithridatic War
- Hospitaller conquest of Rhodes (1306–1310), the Knights Hospitaller invade Rhodes except for the city of Rhodes
- Siege of Rhodes (1444), unsuccessful attempt by the Mamluks under Aynal Gecut to expel the Knights Hospitaller from the island
- Siege of Rhodes (1480), first, unsuccessful attempt by the Ottoman Empire to expel the Knights Hospitaller from the island
- Siege of Rhodes (1522), second, successful attempt by the Ottoman Empire to expel the Knights Hospitaller from the island
- Battle of Rhodes (1912), capture of the island by Italy during the Italo-Turkish War
- Battle of Rhodes (1943), German capture of the island during World War II

It may also refer to:

- The Siege of Rhodes, an opera written by the impresario William Davenant, inspired by the 1522 siege
