= Battle of Vellica =

Battle of the Cantabrian Wars with the right location unknown

Coordinates: 42.7436°N 4.2867°W

- Part of the Cantabrian Wars
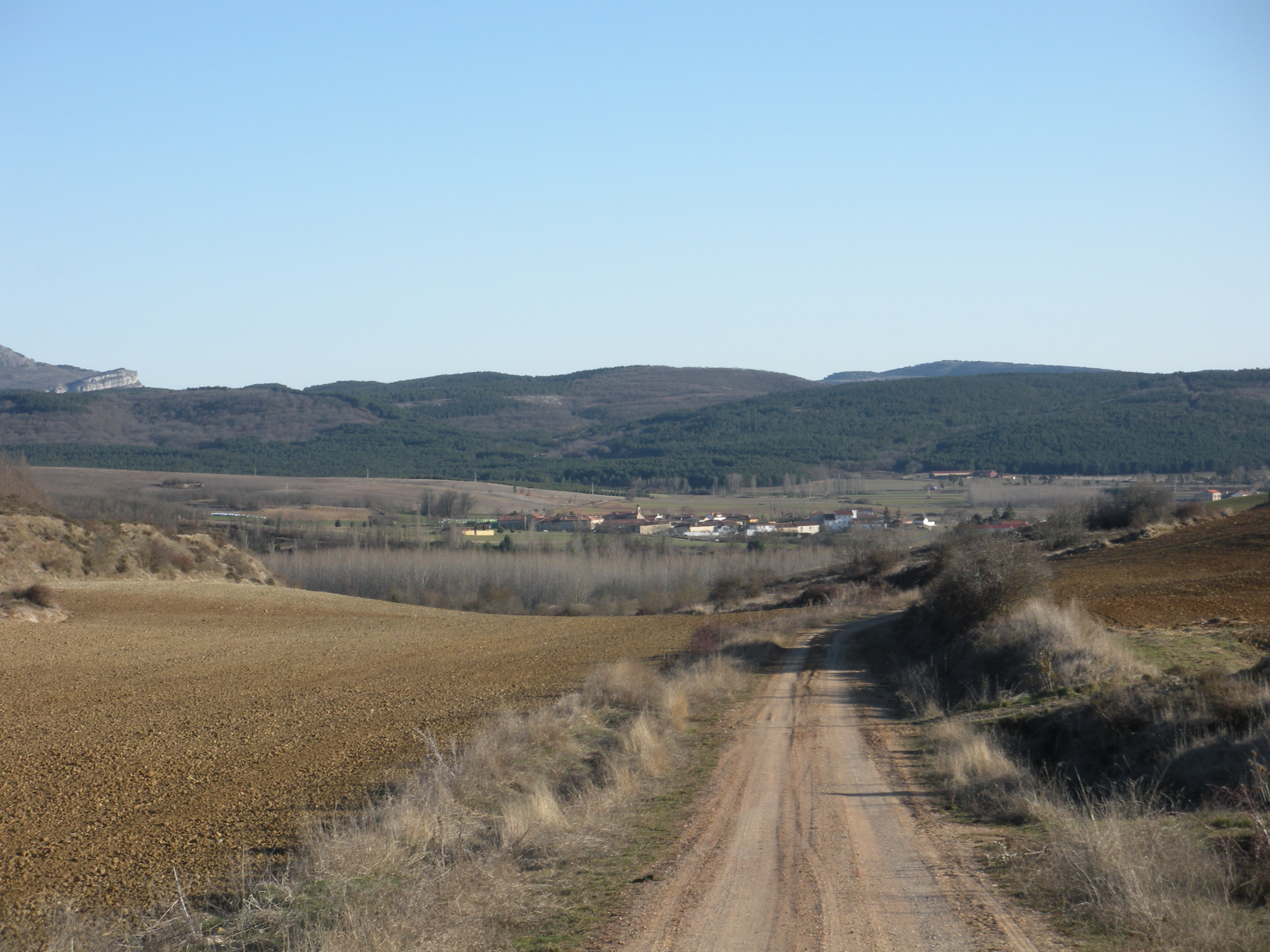
- The Monte Cildá site where historians believe the battle took place. (Mave is the location that can be seen in the centre)
Date	25 BC
Location	Vellica, Cantabria, Hispania
Result	Roman victory

Belligerents
Roman Empire	Cantabri

Commanders and leaders
Augustus	Unknown

The Battle of Vellica was a battle of the Cantabrian Wars fought in the year 25 BC by the emperor Augustus and his Roman legions against the Cantabri forces who resided in the area. The most generally accepted location for the battle is the area around Monte Cildá, Olleros de Pisuerga, Palencia.

== Location ==
Cildá was populated by the Cantabri people. Claudius Ptolemy (II,6,51) mentions Vellika first amongst the Cantabrian towns.

Certain authors such as Adolf Schulten, Miguel Ángel García Guinea and Iglesias Gil have placed the battle and the town of Vellica in an area near Monte Cildá. According to Joaquín González Echegaray, this town corresponded with the fortifications built on Monte Cildá (where there appeared an inscription that cites the clan of the Vellicum), and that had to be taken by the Romans from the south, after capture of Amaya but before the battle at Castro de Monte Bernorio.

It has likewise been inferred that Vellica and Bergida refer to the same city in different chronicles. Another widely accepted belief is that the town could be on the adjacent plain of Mave and that the hill fort was merely a complementary defensive position.

== Battle ==
From about 29 BC the Romans began a definitive push into the territories dominated by the Cantabri and the Astures, commencing the so-called Cantabrian Wars. The Romans were led in person by the emperor Augustus.

According to the chronicles of Florus and Orosius, a momentous battle occurred at the town of Vellica between the Romans, led by Caesar Augustus and the Cantabrians that culminated in the taking of the town in around 25 BC. It is likely that these chronicles refer to the plain of Mave which is where other historians place the battle. Unlike in previous confrontations, in this battle, the Cantabrians decided to face the Romans on open ground to give battle, possibly due to the lack of supplies necessary to defend the hill fort.

This battle was won decisively by the powerful Legio IV Macedonica, mustered in Segisama Iulia (Sasamón), as a prelude to the eventual assault on Castro de Monte Bernorio. It is also likely that the Legio IX Hispana also took part in the fighting given the size of the battle. After the defeat of the Cantabrians, the Roman forces levelled the tribe's fortress and town structures.

== See also ==
- List of Roman wars and battles
