= Battle of Geronium =

Battle of the Second Punic War

- Part of the Second Punic War
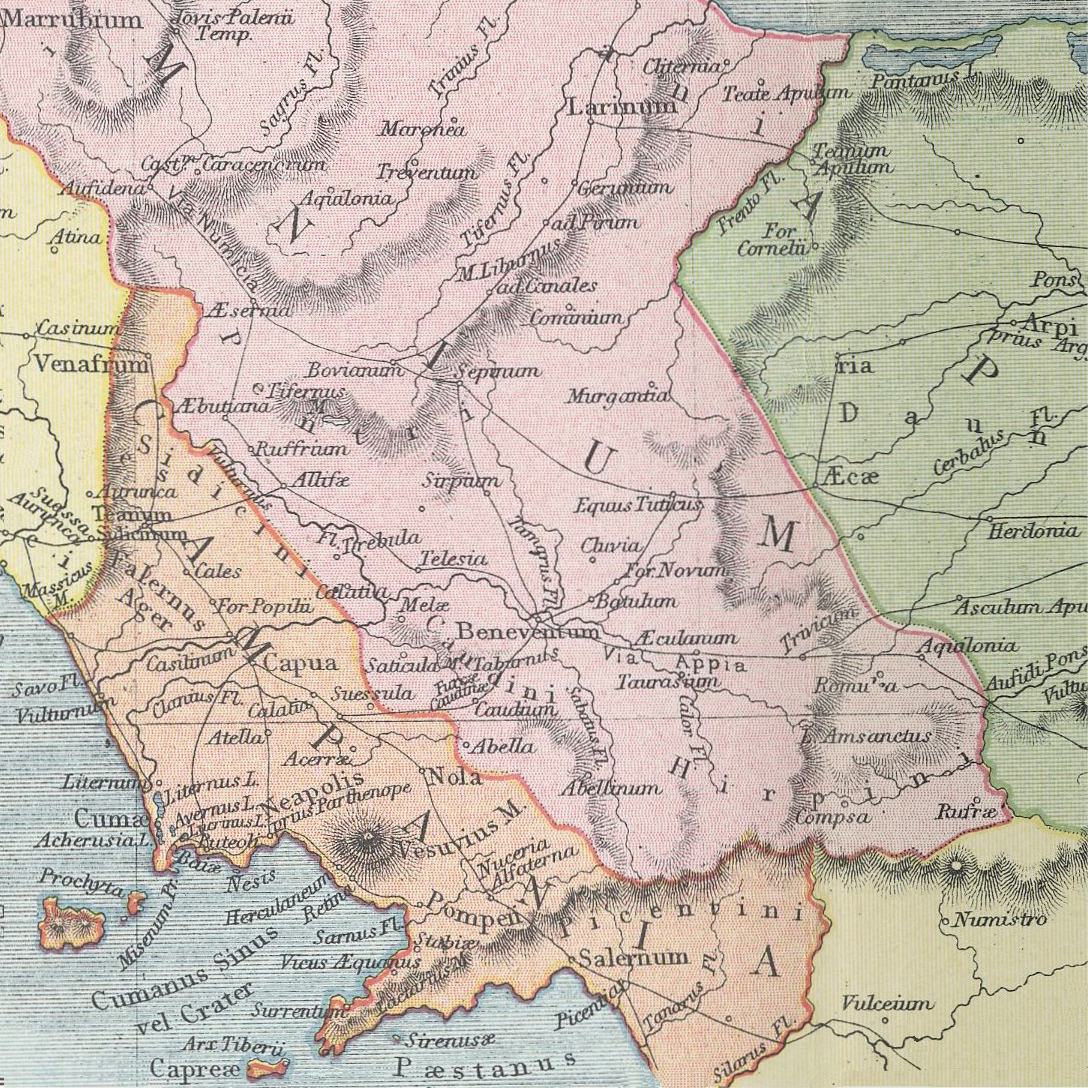
- Map of Southern Samnium
Date	Summer to Autumn 217 BC
Location	Geronium, Molise, Italy 41.7618°N 14.7334°E
Result	Carthaginian victory

Belligerents
Carthage	Roman Republic

Commanders and leaders
Hannibal	Marcus Minucius Rufus; Quintus Fabius Maximus Verrucosus

Strength
Skirmish: 20,000; Battle: 50,000	Skirmish: 20,000; Battle: 40,000

Casualties and losses
Unknown	Skirmish: 5,000 killed Battle: Thousands killed

The Battle of Geronium (also spelled Gerunium) was a significant engagement fought between the forces of Carthage and the Roman Republic during the summer and autumn of 217 BC, amid the broader context of the Second Punic War. The confrontation resulted in a tactical victory for the Carthaginian general Hannibal Barca, consolidating his position in southern Italy and further undermining Roman morale.

Following his successful maneuvering in the Battle of Ager Falernus, Hannibal led his army northward before turning east toward Molise, passing through the rugged terrain of Samnium. Throughout this movement, he was shadowed by Roman forces under the command of Quintus Fabius Maximus Verrucosus, who continued to implement his strategy of attrition—later known as the Fabian strategy—deliberately avoiding pitched battle with Hannibal's superior tactical forces.

Fabius's cautious approach, while militarily prudent, was politically unpopular in Rome. Facing criticism, he temporarily returned to the city under the pretense of performing religious duties, leaving his second-in-command, Marcus Minucius Rufus, in operational control.

During Fabius's absence, Minucius launched an aggressive attack on a Carthaginian detachment near Geronium, inflicting notable losses and killing approximately 5,000 enemy troops in what was likely a large-scale skirmish. This perceived success won Minucius popular support in Rome, leading the Senate to elevate him to equal authority with Fabius—a rare dual command structure in Roman military tradition.

Minucius, now operating independently, took control of half the Roman forces and established a separate camp near Geronium. Seizing the opportunity, Hannibal devised an elaborate ambush, exploiting Minucius's overconfidence. He drew out the Roman forces and launched a coordinated attack, enveloping Minucius's detachment. The intervention of Fabius with the remaining Roman forces prevented a complete rout, but the Romans suffered substantial casualties.

In the aftermath of the battle, a chastened Minucius acknowledged Fabius's superior judgment and relinquished his independent command. He resumed his previous position as Master of the Horse (Magister Equitum), restoring unity in Roman leadership at a critical juncture in the war.

== Background ==
After escaping from the trap of Ager Falernus and winning the Battle of Ager Falernus, Hannibal, with his army and spoils, marched east toward Molise. Still committed to a delaying strategy, Fabius followed Hannibal cautiously, keeping to the high ground and avoiding being drawn into a pitched battle at all costs.

== Prelude ==
=== Carthaginian march through central Italy ===
Hannibal withdraws to Gereonium, 217 BC

After leaving Ager Falernus through the pass of Callifae, Hannibal retraced his steps, moving east towards Molise. The Carthaginian army, encumbered with plunder and herds of cattle, moved slowly, seeking a place to set up their winter quarters. Fabius and the Romans dogged the Carthaginians from a distance and avoided confrontation with them. Hannibal marched north to Venefram, which caused alarm in Rome as the city was thought to be the Carthaginian objective. The Carthaginian army then turned east into Samnium, and after crossing the Apennine Mountains and moving through the Pelignial plains, finally entered Molise. Fabius continued to follow Hannibal, and when the Carthaginians reached Geronimom (near the modern-day village of Casacalenda) and took over the town, Fabius set up his camp at Larinum, 20 miles to the south.

The Carthaginians had cut a swath of destruction in their march, ravaging farms and property, collecting provisions and prisoners as they moved, unopposed by Fabius. Hannibal tried various provocations to get Fabius to fight, even sparing the property of Fabius while devastating all else, to cast doubts about him.

When Fabius found out during a prisoner exchange that Hannibal held 247 people more than the Romans did, and the Senate declined to fund their ransom, he sold part of the property to ransom the prisoners, and then refused to accept any money from the freed prisoners. The Fabian Policy of following Hannibal around Italy but refusing battle had become so unpopular that the Romans named Fabius Hannibal's "paedagogus", after a certain class of slaves who followed a Roman child to school carrying his books.

=== Carthaginian camp in Molise ===
Hannibal either took Geronium by assault after his terms had been refused by the townsfolk, or by simply taking possession of the town because the inhabitants had fled. After the burning of town buildings, part of the town wall had collapsed, making it vulnerable to attack. The Carthaginians turned the town into a large granary for storing their grain and housing their animal herds, then set up a camp outside the town to billet the army, and finally surrounded the town and the camp with a trench and palisade. While the sick and wounded recovered in the camp, thousands of foragers fanned out throughout the plain to harvest crops while others pastured their cattle and horses on the mountainside. Two-thirds of the army was employed in these operations while the rest guarded the camp.

=== Minucius in command ===
While the Carthaginians had been busy at Geronium, Fabius had left Minucius in charge of the Roman army with instructions to follow the 'Fabian Strategy' and journeyed to Rome to observe religious duties. He possibly also engaged in political bickering because of his unpopularity among the Roman citizens. Minucius, who had always advocated a more forward strategy against Hannibal, moved down from the hills after a few days and set up a new camp in the plain of Larinum to the north of Geronium. The Romans then began harassing the Carthaginian foragers from their new camp as Minucius sought to provoke Hannibal into battle. In response, Hannibal moved near the Roman camp from Geronium with two-thirds of his army, and built a temporary camp, and occupied a hill overlooking the Roman camp with 2,000 Libyphoenician pikemen. The mobility of the Carthaginians was restricted at this time as their cavalry horses were being rested. This had also deprived Hannibal of his best weapon against the Romans, a fact which would come into play soon. Minucius promptly attacked with his light infantry, driving back the pikemen posted on the hill, and moved his camp to the top of the captured hill.

Minucius’ victory outside Gereonium, 217 BC

=== Skirmish ===
Responding to the Roman move, the Carthaginians reduced the number of their foragers for a few days and kept the army in readiness within their camp situated near the Roman camp. Minucius sat tight in his camp, emulating Fabius. Hannibal sent out parties in increasing numbers for foraging. The Romans, seizing their chance, sent out light infantry and horsemen through the back gate of their camp to cut off and kill a large number of Carthaginian foragers, who were scattered all over the plain of Geronium. Minucius led the infantry in strength towards the temporary Carthaginian camp itself, where most of the Carthaginians had taken refuge after being worsted in the initial clash. With his foragers under attack and his camp in danger of being assaulted, Hannibal led out a sortie against the attacking Roman infantry.

With only a third of the army present and most of their cavalry absent, the outnumbered Carthaginians fought a small-scale battle, not of their choosing, and fared poorly during the engagement. The Romans, at first shaken by the initial Carthaginian onslaught, finally gained the upper hand when a fresh force numbering 8,000 foot and 500 horses led by Lucius Decimus the Samnite, arrived in the rear of the Carthaginians, having been sent by Fabius to join the army at Geronium.

The Carthaginians withdrew, the Romans gave chase and at one point, Minucius considered overrunning and dismantling the camp itself. The arrival of Hasdrubal (the Quartermaster General) with 4,000 foragers gave Hannibal the confidence to deploy his army for battle, and Minucius chose to withdraw to his camp. Exaggerated Roman accounts claimed 6,000 Carthaginians died both in the engagement and throughout the countryside, with 5,000 Roman troops slain. The Romans had managed to catch the Carthaginians at a disadvantage and had inflicted a large number of casualties during this skirmish. This was the only time Hannibal had been drawn into large-scale skirmishing and had surrendered the initiative to the enemy during the war.

The Roman army outnumbered the Carthaginians, and the Carthaginian army was divided between two camps while the Romans were concentrated. From his position, Minucius could harass the Carthaginian detachment under Hannibal with part of his force. There was the possibility of a Roman attack on Geronium itself following a night march, leading to the loss of all his provisions. Hannibal chose to reduce the risk to his army and fell back to the main camp at Geronium. Minucius immediately occupied the deserted Carthaginian camp.

=== Minucius rewarded by Roman Senate ===
Minucius' success was hailed as a great victory in Rome. The Roman army commanded by Fabius did little except follow Hannibal around and watch him ruin the Roman economy, while the same army under a different general had caused Hannibal to retreat. So, the Roman senate sought a way to reward Minucius for his service to the state.

The Roman political tradition and system did not allow the removal of a dictator during his term in office. Because Fabius was a dictator who had been elected by the senate (not the usual way to become dictator), the senate considered other options to minimize his powers. A praetor named "Metellus" or, according to other sources, Gaius Terentius Varro (the future consul in 216 BC), proposed a bill to elevate Minucius to the equal rank of Fabius. The bill was promptly passed, giving Rome two dictators at once for the first time in history and for practical purposes reducing the status of a dictator to that of a consul. Upon returning to the army, Fabius proposed to either command the whole army on alternate days or split their army into two independent commands. Minucius chose to split the army and took legions numbers II and III, and two allied legions. They encamped one and a half miles south of where Fabius camped, possibly on the site of Hannibal's temporary camp. In the coming days, Minucius would act just as the senate had expected, but he would almost end up rendering the type of "service" to Rome that it could ill afford and the likes of which Fabius had striven to avoid in the preceding months of the campaign.

== Hannibal's response ==
The results of this debacle had not changed the strategic situation for Hannibal. His main winter base at Geronill remained secured, and the Carthaginian general had not planned any major operations for the time being. The Roman army still outnumbered the Carthaginian one, and Hannibal did not wish to engage it unless he could ensure a decisive tactical advantage for his soldiers to win any future engagements with minimal casualties. A war of attrition was a luxury he could not afford, being cut off from regular reinforcements from Carthage and adrift in hostile territory.

When informed of the division of the Roman army, Hannibal reconsidered his strategic position and studied the possibility of destroying a part of the Roman army in a pitched battle. The Roman armies were camped separately, so one army could be drawn out and engaged under favorable conditions before the other could intervene. It was a foregone conclusion that Minucius was more likely to swallow whatever bait was laid out by Hannibal, as Fabius had shown himself to be immune to all forms of provocation throughout the summer of 217 BC. So, it became a question of getting Minucius to fight before Fabius did anything, not fighting Fabius before Minucius hightailed to the rescue. Hannibal's next challenge was to formulate a plan to entrap and destroy the Roman army commanded by Minucius. After a careful study of the terrain, Hannibal devised a tactical plan which would take advantage of the aggressiveness of Minucius and the geographical features of the chosen battle site. The plan was to entice Minucius with a careful and timed manoeuvre into thinking that he was fighting a repeat of the skirmish he had earlier fought at Geroniu while springing a trap similar to the one Hannibal had sprung on the Romans at the Battle of Trebbia in 218 BC on the unsuspecting army of Minucius. It had been suggested that Hannibal deliberately lost the skirmish to obtain an opportunity, but that is speculation.

=== Carthaginian bait ===
The ground between the Carthaginian and Roman camps was flat and treeless, with a low ridge sitting midway between the camps. There were hollows and dead patches of land behind and beside the hill where soldiers could hide without being noticed. Hannibal selected a picked body of 5,000 infantry and 500 cavalry, and ordered them to conceal themselves in groups of 200-300 in the hollows and dead ground on the night before the battle. The skill and discipline of the Carthaginians is evident through their flawless execution of this potentially hazardous operation. At dawn, a contingent of Carthaginian light infantry took position on the hill in full view of the Romans. From their vantage point, the Carthaginians on the hill could spy on the Romans, just like those Minucius had dislodged from a hill at the start of the previous skirmish. However, unlike that encounter, Hannibal was fully prepared for the Roman response.

=== Battle of Geronium ===
Seeing the Carthaginians deployed on the hill, Minucius sent a group of velites to drive them off. In turn, Hannibal reinforced the hill with just enough soldiers to fight the Romans to a stalemate. This caused Minucius to send the Roman and Italian allied cavalry up the hill, which Hannibal immediately countered with his light Numidian cavalry and heavy Spanish and Libyphoenician cavalry. With the cavalry engaged, Minucius lost his best tool for scouting the battleground and discovering the trap Hannibal had set for him. After skirmishing for a while, the Roman cavalry slowly began to give ground against their more skilled opponents.

Minucius, observing the situation, now called out his four legions and marched towards and then up the hill. Hannibal had also deployed his infantry beyond the hill and now advanced to meet the advancing Romans. The sequence and timing of events, all planned and orchestrated by Hannibal, did not give the Roman general any time to examine the ground or scout the area. Fabius, who was watching the events unfold from his camp, called his army to arms but did not move out to help his fellow general.

Just as the Roman infantry commanded by Minucius reached the hill and was moving up the slopes, the Roman cavalry broke and began to scatter. The Roman light troops, already hard-pressed, were also driven back on the marching legions. The Roman battle formation was disrupted, and before the Romans could regain cohesion, the Carthaginians concealed in the hollows emerged and fell on the exposed flanks and rear of the Roman battle line. Hannibal and his infantry struck the now unbalanced Romans from the front before the shock of the ambush faded or Minucius could take corrective action. Attacked from all sides, a part of the Romans broke ranks and fled. Others were surrounded and fought for their lives.

Fabius rescues Minucius, 217 BC

Seeing the disaster unfolding from his camp, Fabius marched out with his four legions to join the battle. Hannibal is said to have remarked, "That cloud on the mountains has broken in the storm at last!" The fleeing Romans of Minucius' dissolving army began to form up with Fabius' legions. The Carthaginians, caught between the armies of Fabius and Minucius, retreated. Both armies regrouped and redeployed for battle, but now outnumbered as he was, Hannibal did not allow anything more than skirmishing. He broke contact and retired to his camp. Fabius promptly followed suit and the battle was over.

Possibly Hannibal did not wish to fight a battle of attrition against a still superior army, over half of which was fresh while the Carthaginians had been fighting for years. Strategically, the destruction of the Roman army would not have changed the balance of power significantly for Hannibal at the time. While the Carthaginians wintered at Geronium the Romans would have raised another army to deal with him. On the other hand, had Hannibal lost the battle, he might have lost the war on the spot. Still, the Carthaginians had inflicted severe casualties on the Romans, and only the timely action of Fabius saved Rome from dealing with a new disaster, all in the space of six months.

== Aftermath ==
Hannibal withdraws to Cannae, 216 BC

After the battle, Minucius turned over supreme command to Fabius, resuming his duties as the Master of the Horse, and billeted his remaining troops with those of Fabius. Minucius, after his rescue, hailed Fabius as his father, and instructed his troops to treat the troops of Fabius as their patrons. Fabius, for his part, did not humiliate Minucius for the debacle and allowed him all the honours due to his position. Both Romans and Carthaginians then went to winter quarters, and no large actions were fought during the winter. After the term of Fabius as dictator expired in December of 217 BC, the army was turned over to the incoming consuls Attilus Regulus and Servillus Geminus. The armies of Carthage and Rome remained in Geronium until June 216 BC, when Hannibal decided to start for Cannae.

== Bibliography ==
- Bagnall, Nigel (1990). The Punic Wars. Macmillan. ISBN 0-312-34214-4.
- Cottrell, Leonard (1992). Hannibal: Enemy of Rome. Da Capo Press. ISBN 0-306-80498-0.
- Lazenby, John Francis (1978). Hannibal's War. Aris & Phillips. ISBN 0-85668-080-X.
- Goldsworthy, Adrian (2003). The Fall of Carthage. Cassel Military Paperbacks. ISBN 0-304-36642-0.
- Peddie, John (2005). Hannibal's War. Sutton Publishing Limited. ISBN 0-7509-3797-1.
- Lancel, Serge (1999). Hannibal. Blackwell Publishers. ISBN 0-631-21848-3.
- Baker, G. P. (1999). Hannibal. Cooper Square Press. ISBN 0-8154-1005-0.

=== Further reading ===
- Dodge, Theodore A. (1891). Hannibal. Da Capo Press. ISBN 0-306-81362-9.
- Warry, John (1993). Warfare in the Classical World. Salamander Books Ltd. ISBN 1-56619-463-6.
- Livius, Titus (1972). The War With Hannibal. Penguin Books. ISBN 0-14-044145-X.
- Delbruck, Hans (1990). Warfare in Antiquity, Volume 1. University of Nebraska Press. ISBN 0-8032-9199-X.
- Lancel, Serge (1997). Carthage A History. Blackwell Publishers. ISBN 1-57718-103-4.
