= Battle of Pavia (disambiguation) =

Battle of Pavia may refer to the following battles:

- Battle of Pavia (271) – Alamanni invasion of the Roman Empire
- Battle of Pavia (352) – Roman civil war of 350–353
- Battle of Pavia (538) – Gothic Wars
- Battle of Pavia (1431) – Wars in Lombardy
- Battle of Pavia (1512) – War of the League of Cambrai
- Battle of Pavia (1525) – Italian War of 1521

== See also ==
- Siege of Pavia (disambiguation)
