= Battle of Thermae =

Battle in 259 BCE

- Part of the First Punic War
Date	259 BC
Location	Thermae (modern Termini Imerese), Sicily 37°59′14″N 13°41′46″E
Result	Carthaginian victory

Belligerents
Carthage	Roman Republic

Commanders and leaders
Hamilcar	Gaius Aquillius Florus

Strength
50,000	6,000

Casualties and losses
Unknown	4,000–6,000 killed

The Battle of Thermae was a field engagement during the First Punic War that took place in 259 BC near Thermae on the northern coast of Sicily. The Carthaginian general Hamilcar surprised and defeated 6,000 allied troops of Rome.

Separated from the main Roman force of 20,000 men due to disagreements, the allies were attacked and crushed near Thermae, losing 4,000–6,000 killed. Hamilcar went on to capture Enna and Camarina in the aftermath.

== Prelude ==
Hamilcar, the commander of the Carthaginian land forces in Sicily, had stationed his army near Panormus. He received word that the Romans and their allies, with a total force of 20,000 men, quarreled over their accomplishments in battle, and that the 6,000 allies were isolated in their encampment between Paropus and Thermae.

== Battle ==
Hamilcar attacked the Roman allies with his entire army of 50,000, taking by surprise the allies, who were preparing to move out. Some 4,000–6,000 allies were killed.

== Aftermath ==
Hamilcar exploited his victory to capture Enna and Camarina that same year with the aid of traitors in the two cities.

== Bibliography ==
- Lazenby, John Francis (1996). The First Punic War: A Military History. Stanford, California: Stanford University Press. ISBN 0-8047-2673-6. OCLC 34371250.
- Rankov, Boris (2011). "A War of Phases: Strategies and Stalemates 264–241". In Hoyos, Dexter (ed.). A Companion to the Punic Wars. Oxford: Wiley-Blackwell. ISBN 978-1-405-17600-2.
