= Battle of Ostia (409) =

409 battle

Date	409 AD
Location	Ostia, Italy
Result	Visigothic victory

Belligerents
Visigoths	Western Roman Empire

Commanders and leaders
Alaric I	Unknown

Strength
Unknown	Unknown

Casualties and losses
Unknown	Unknown

The Battle of Ostia was fought in 409 AD between the Visigoths and the Western Roman Empire. The battle was part of the invasion of Italy by the Visigothic king Alaric I. Having driven the emperor Honorius into Ravenna, Alaric laid siege to Rome. In order to support his siege, Alaric attacked the nearby city of Ostia at the mouth of the Tiber. He took the city port along with a massive amount of food supplies destined for the capital. A year after seizing Ostia, Alaric sacked Rome.

== Sources ==
- Jaques, Tony (2007). Dictionary of Battles and Sieges: F-O. Greenwood Publishing Group. ISBN 978-0313335389.
