= Siege of Antioch (51 BC) =

Siege of the Roman–Parthian Wars

Coordinates: 36.2045°N 36.1813°E

- Part of the Roman–Parthian Wars
- Map of the Parthian–Roman borders, c. 55 BC.
Date	51-50 BC
Location	Antigoneia of Syria, near modern Antioch
Result	Roman victory

Belligerents
Roman Republic	Parthian Empire

Commanders and leaders
Gaius Cassius Longinus	Pacorus I Osaces (DOW)

The siege of Antioch (or battle of Antigonia) was fought 51–50 BC between the Romans and the Parthians, following a raid by the latter against the region of Antioch in Syria.

== Historical context ==
Roman–Parthian relations had deteriorated following the reckless expedition of Marcus Licinius Crassus (the triumvir), which had culminated in the disaster of the Battle of Carrhae and the death of Crassus himself in 53 BC. Surena's victory over the Romans at Carrhae was devastating and had enormous consequences. It halted Roman expansion, gave Mesopotamia back to the Parthians, and consolidated the Euphrates as the boundary between the two powers. It placed Persia on an equal footing with Rome, making them political rivals for the next seven centuries. Partly to avenge that unjustified aggression and partly to take advantage of the weakness of the Romans in the East, in 51 BC the Parthians organized a raid against the Roman province of Syria and in particular against its capital Antioch.

=== Raid ===
The Parthian raid was nominally led by Prince Pacorus I. The actual command fell to the experienced general Osaces. Cicero, who was at the time governor of the neighbouring province of Cilicia, reported that he had learned of the invasion on a date which corresponds to 20 September 51 BC. The province of Syria was governed by Gaius Cassius Longinus who had few troops at his disposal and who was also waiting to be replaced by the new governor Bibulus.

Having crossed the Euphrates, the Parthians plundered the surroundings of Antioch. Their aim was raiding, not territorial conquest, and their forces traditionally had their core in the cavalry.

Meanwhile, Cassius, whose forces were not sufficient to face Osaces in the open field, had to remain shut up in Antioch. This inaction pushed the Parthians even to attempt a siege of the city, a type of operation in which the Parthians had no experience and for which they lacked adequate equipment. Thus, the Romans succeeded in repelling them.

The Parthians then withdrew to the city of Antigonia. According to Cassius Dio, in this case the obstacle the Parthians encountered were the thick woods surrounding the city. They planned to cut them down, but the undertaking took a long time and did not yield the desired results, while in the meantime Cassius' forces attacked the groups they surprised dispersed. In the end, the Parthians gave up and planned to strike other areas, but Cassius, who had participated in the disaster of Carrhae a few years earlier and had performed better than his commander in chief at the time, had made his bones and turned against the Parthians a stratagem in which they were masters: a small group of Romans confronted them and immediately afterwards feigned a flight. Pursued, he led the Parthians into an ambush, where many of them were killed. On a scale and with an indisputably lesser importance, the defeat of Carrhae was returned to the Parthians, and in Rome it was considered a "revenge for Carrhae". It must have been a battle of some importance, if only because Osaces himself died there. According to Cassius Dio, he perished in the battle, while according to Cicero, who was present in the same theater of operations and was therefore probably better informed, he was seriously wounded and died from the consequences of the wound some time later.

Following the death of Osaces, the Parthians wintered in northern Syria. They again besieged Antioch in 50 BC. This time defended by Bibulus, who using a range of tactics, was able to create disorder within the Parthian camp. The Parthians then left Syria in the latter half of 50 BC.

== Sources ==
=== Primary or ancient ===
- Cassius Dio, Historia Romanae;
- Cicero, Epistulae ad Familiares, Epistulae ad Atticum;

=== Secondary or modern ===
- Shahbazi, A. Shapur (1990). "Carrhae". Encyclopaedia Iranica.
- Bivar, A.D.H. (1983). "The Political History of Iran Under the Arsacids". In Yarshater, Ehsan (ed.). The Cambridge History of Iran: The Seleucid, Parthian and Sasanian Periods. Vol. 3(1). Cambridge: Cambridge University Press. pp. 21–99. ISBN 0-521-20092-X.
- Kennedy, David (1996), "Parthia and Rome: eastern perspectives", in Kennedy, David L.; Braund, David (eds.), The Roman Army in the East, Ann Arbor: Cushing Malloy Inc., Journal of Roman Archaeology: Supplementary Series Number Eighteen, pp. 67–90, ISBN 978-1-887829-18-2
- Sartre, Maurice (2005). The Middle East under Rome. Belknap Press.
- Schlude, Jason M. (2020). Rome, Parthia, and the Politics of Peace: The Origins of War in the Ancient Middle East. Taylor & Francis.
