= Siege of Rhodes (88 BC) =

Battle of the First Mithridatic War

- Part of the First Mithridatic War
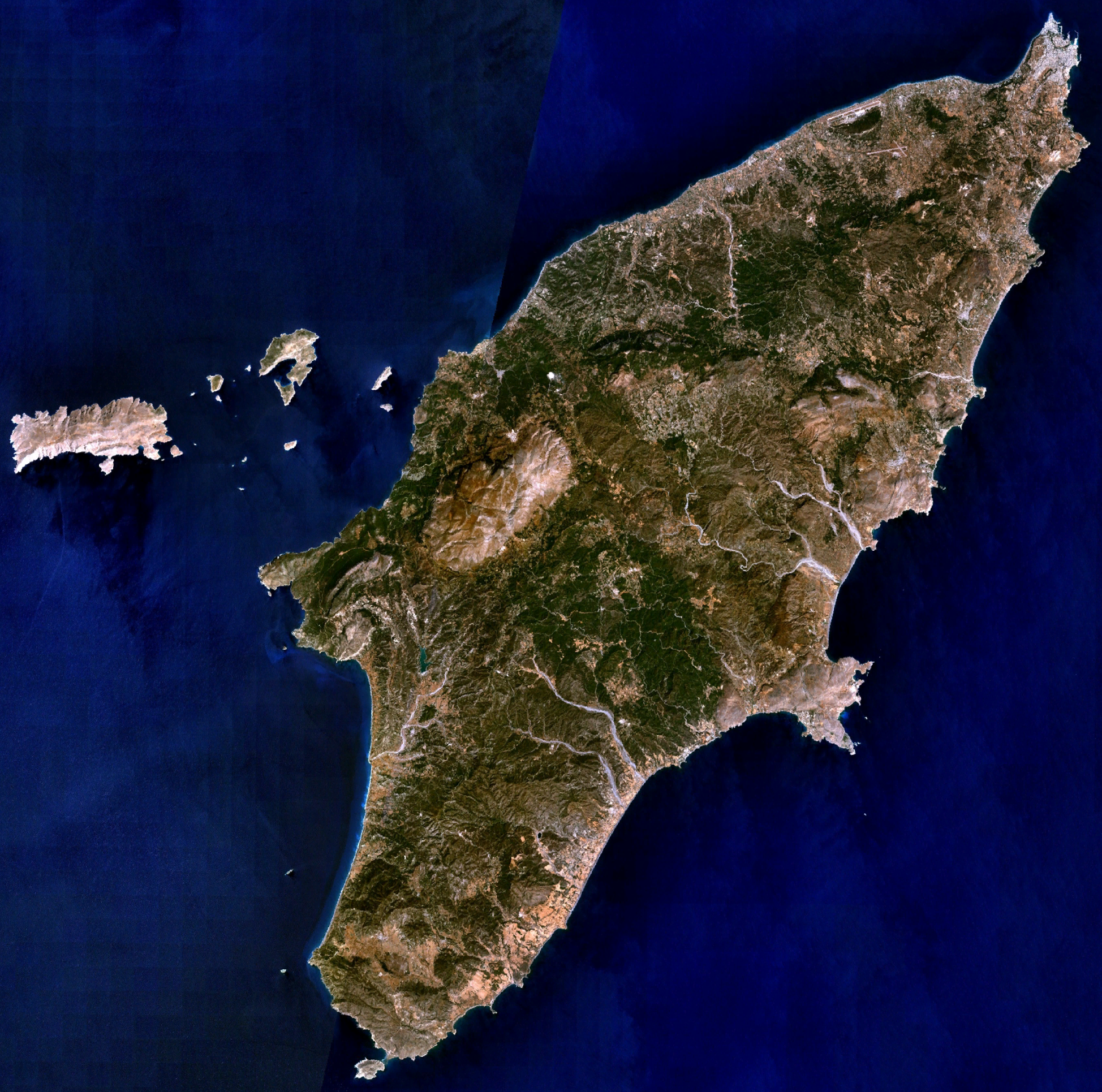
- Modern satellite photo of Rhodes
Date	88 BC
Location	Rhodes
Result	Rhodian victory

Belligerents
Rhodes (client state and allied to Rome)	Pontic Empire

Commanders and leaders
Lucius Cassius; Demagoras	Mithridates VI of Pontus

Casualties and losses
	400 prisoners

The siege of Rhodes was a battle of the First Mithridatic War that took place in 88 BC, during which King Mithridates of Pontus unsuccessfully besieged the city of Rhodes, allied to the Roman Republic. The Rhodian forces were led by an admiral called Demagoras and the Roman proconsul of Asia, Lucius Cassius, who had retreated to the island after the Roman defeat at Protopachium. Despite using complex siege engines, Mithridates was unable to take the island.

== Prelude ==
After securing mainland Asia Minor Mithridates moved on to the islands of the Aegean. He first invaded the island of Kos, a very lucrative conquest (and probably the main reason for the invasion) as the Ptolemies of Egypt and many other nations and people (like the Jews of Alexandria) had stashed part of their treasury there. The people of Kos did not put up a fight and received Mithridates as a liberator not a conqueror. Besides the treasuries Mithridates got a hold of young prince Ptolemy Auletes, who was being held safe on Kos. The people of Kos distinguished themselves by insisting that the Romans on the island, who were granted sanctuary, were not to be harmed. After Kos Mithridates went on to Mytilene on Lesbos which also surrendered without a fight. The next target was the island of Rhodes.

The Roman governor of Asia, Lucius Cassius, had fled to Rhodes and was marshalling the resistance against Mithridates on the island. Many surviving Romans and Italians had also fled to Rhodes and were assisting the Rhodians in bolstering their defences. When word arrived of Mithridates pending arrival the defenders destroyed all building outside their walls and prepared for the upcoming assault.

During the famous siege of Rhodes of 200 years prior, Rhodes had successfully defended itself from Demetrius I of Macedon, commonly known as "Poliorcetes" (The Besieger). Demetrius' engineers had created a large mechanised siege tower called the Helepolis, but despite this taunting technology Rhodes came out with a win. Demetrius' abandoned siege equipment was then used to make the well known Colossus of Rhodes.

Mithridates was all quite aware of this, and he wanted to outdo Demetrius (just like he wished to outdo Alexander the Great). Mithridates had his engineers construct the sambuca (different from the sambuca invented by Heracleides of Tarentum more than 100 years prior). It was a large tower mounted on ships with bridges equipped to safely pass over city walls from sea. Meanwhile, Mithridates sailed in a quinquereme and his land forces awaited orders in Caunus.

== Battle and siege ==
After securing Lesbos Mithridates sailed his fleet to Rhodes, the Rhodian fleet moved out of their harbour and met the Pontic fleet en route. Mithridates, in personal command of the invasion force, ordered his numerically superior fleet to extend its line to envelop the Rhodian fleet. The Rhodians recognized his intentions and backed off quickly to avoid being surrounded. Eventually, without engaging, the Rhodians slipped back into their harbour. The Rhodians decided on a strategy of opportunist lightning strikes at the Pontic fleet. Soon there occurred one of the opportunities the Rhodian fleet had been waiting for. A royal supply ship, secure in their belief the Rhodians were penned up in their harbour, ventured close to the port and was attacked and captured by a swift bireme. The Pontic fleet hurried to retrieve the situation, but were met by Rhodian reinforcements. Appian reports:

A severe engagement followed. Both in his fury and in the size of his fleet, Mithridates was superior to his opponents, but the Rhodians circled skilfully and rammed his ships to such effect that the battle ended with the Rhodians retiring into their harbour with a captured trireme in tow and other spoils besides.

Soon after, the Pontic forces captured a Rhodian quinquereme. They kept his triumph a secret hoping the Rhodians would venture out to look for their missing ship. Eventually, the Rhodians sent out a search party of six ships. Mithridates dispatched twenty-six ships after them. The Rhodian commander used the superior speed of his ships to avoid action until sunset. Then, when the Pontic ships turned to break of their pointless pursuit, the Rhodians suddenly wheeled and hit their opponents from the rear. Two Pontic ships were sunk, the rest scattered while the Rhodians sailed on and slipped back into their port almost unscathed.

In the chaos that followed the Rhodian action, Mithridates's flagship was accidentally rammed by a ship from Chios. This incident shook Mithridates's confidence in the loyalty of his Greek allies, the Chians in particular. This would have profound consequences later on in the war.

When the Pontic transport fleet arrived the Rhodians raced out to meet them and do as much damage as they could. The transports had arrived sooner than expected and in considerable disorder as a result of a storm which had swept them towards Rhodes. Mithridates did not have his warfleet in position to properly protect his transports and now the Rhodians were among them burning, ramming and capturing ships. Eventually, the overwhelming weight of the Pontic warfleet caused the Rhodians to retreat, but they had done considerable damage.

At this point Mithridates decided to use the Sambucca against Rhodes. The Sambucca was supported by other assault ships which were filled with soldiers with siege ladders. The sea attack was to coincide with an assault on the landward side, where deserters had shown the king a suitable spot for an attack. Unfortunately for Mithridates, his land forces mistook Rhodian warning signals for the signal to begin the assault and they attacked while most units were still getting into position. Mithridates pulled his army back before it was fully committed, but the damage had been done. The Rhodians were on full alert now and took advantage of the lull in the assault to properly prepare their defence. When the attack finally was launched in earnest the Rhodians were ready. The Pontic land forces were rebuffed with ease and the Sambucca collapsed while it was being maneuvered into place. The site chosen for the Sambucca assault was against the temple of Isis, which was apparently built into the walls. Later the Rhodians claimed that the goddess herself appeared on the walls and heaved a massive fireball at the Sambucca after which it collapsed.

After the failed Sambucca assault Mithridates gave up on besieging Rhodes. He left a fleet to keep an eye on the Rhodians and prevent them from hindering his operations and returned to the mainland.

== Aftermath ==
The war moved from Rhodes to mainland Greece. Eventually, the Rhodians were persuaded to lend part of their navy to the Roman admiral Lucullus who was collecting a fleet for Rome. The Rhodian contingent formed the backbone of Lucullus's fleet and was instrumental in defeating Mithridates's fleet on several occasions. The war ended in a Roman victory which forced Mithridates to abandon all his conquests and return to Pontus. Rhodes continued their alliance as a Friend and Ally of Rome.
