= Siege of Pavia (476) =

| Date | August 476 |
| Location | Pavia |
| Result | Federate victory |

Belligerents
| Foederati | Western Roman Empire |

Commanders and leaders
| Odoacer | Orestes (executed) |

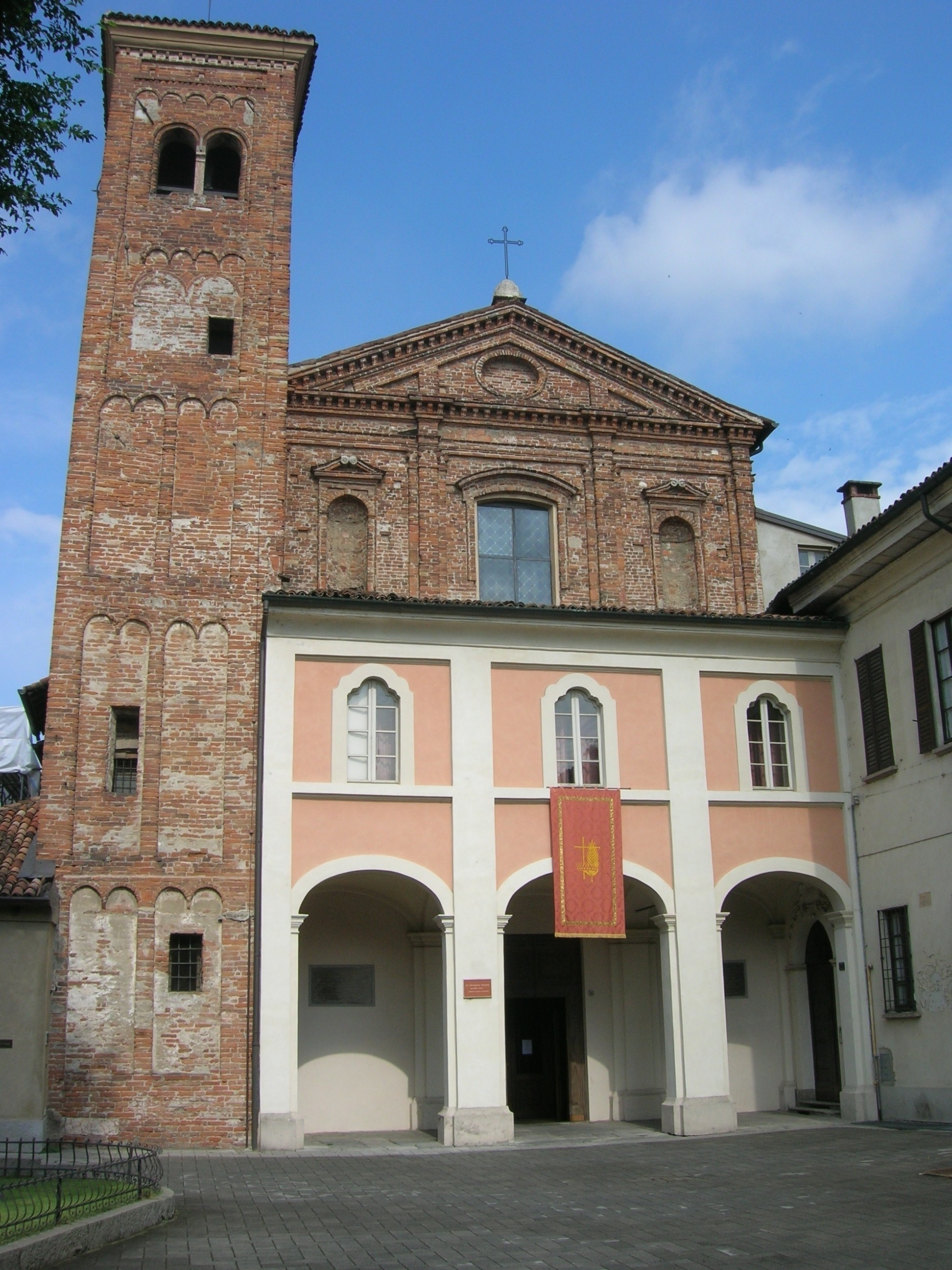
Church Santi Gervasio e Protasio - Pavia

The siege of Pavia in August 476 was a critical event during the fall of the Western Roman Empire. Foederati, including some Sciri, in the Roman army in Italy mutinied. They acclaimed Odovacar king on 23 August, while the magister militum Orestes took refuge in the well fortified city of Pavia (Ticinum). The city "was immediately besieged, the fortifications were stormed, the town was pillaged" and many churches and houses were burned, including the bishop's residence.

An account of the events in Pavia is given by Magnus Felix Ennodius in his Life of Bishop Epiphanius of Pavia (§§95–100). Ennodius presents the siege as contrived by the devil to inconvenience the bishop. Epiphanius' sister, a nun named Luminosa, was among the captives. Orestes escaped but was captured at Piacenza (Placentia) on 28 August and executed. Thereafter the disorders subsided.

From Piacenza, Odovacar marched on Ravenna and deposed the emperor Romulus Augustulus.
