= Antony's campaign against Armenia =

34 BC Roman military campaign

- Part of the Roman–Parthian Wars
Date	34 BC
Location	Armenia
Result	Roman victory

Belligerents
Roman Republic	Armenia

Commanders and leaders
Mark Antony	Artavasdes II of Armenia (POW)

Antony's campaign against Armenia occurred in 34 BCE as retaliation for Armenian cavalry deserting Mark Antony against Parthia. Antony thus set out to conquer Armenia.

== Background ==
In 35 BCE, Antony had launched an invasion against Parthia commanding one of the largest single forces ever by a Roman commander, with close to 150,000 men. Part of the invasion force had 6000 Armenian cataphracts along with other cavalry. As Parthia had a primarily cavalry-based military, the Armenian cavalry were essential. In 35 BCE, after Antony's siege equipment had been destroyed by the Parthians, Armenian King Artavasdes II predicted that Antony would suffer defeat and so retreated to Armenia and took his cavalry with him. Antony's invasion of Parthia failed, and he was forced to retreat. However, keen to avoid the mistake of Crassus by retreating through the open desert, he retreated through Armenian mountains.

That allowed him to keep the illusion of friendly relations with the Armenians during his retreat. Antony returned to Alexandria and instantly began a plan to conquer Armenia. Roman sources such as Plutarch and Cassius Dio say that Artavasdes II's betrayal had caused Antony's defeat in Parthia, but modern scholars instead blame a lack of logistical planning on the part of Antony. In addition, Antony needed to boost his prestige in Rome, which had declined due to his defeat against the Parthians..

== Campaign ==
Until the summer of 34 BCE, Antony waited in Alexandria, and he made his attack in early September. The Armenian troops attempted to put up resistance but were no match for the Romans. On September 18, Antony's troops entered the capital and captured Artavasdes II, who was then brought to Alexandria and was kept imprisoned by Cleoptatra until he was executed in 31 BCE. Rome maintained control over Armenia till the War of Actium. In 20 BCE, Augustus negotiated a peace treaty between Rome and Parthia, which led to Armenia becoming a buffer state between them.

== See also ==
- Julius Caesar's planned invasion of the Parthian Empire
