= Battle of Ager Falernus =

Military clash between Rome and Carthage

- Part of the Second Punic War
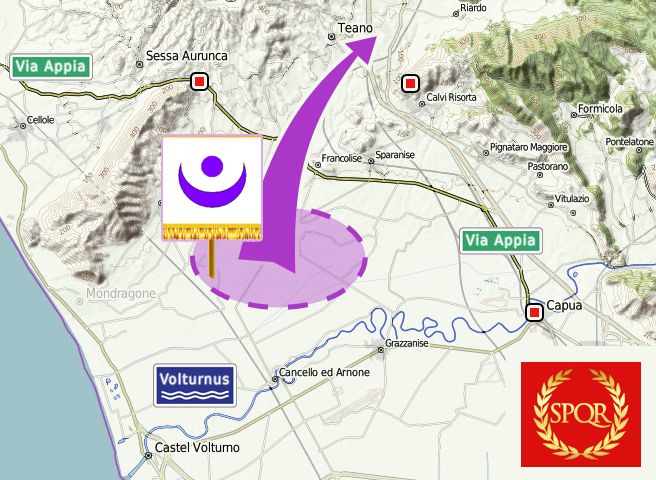
- Hannibal's breakout from Ager Falernus
Date	September 217 BC
Location	Mount Callicula, Campania, present-day Italy 41.1833°N 14.5500°E
Result	Carthaginian victory

Belligerents
Carthage	Roman Republic

Commanders and leaders
Hannibal	Fabius Verrucosus

Strength
2,000 light infantry Unknown Spanish infantry 2,000 oxen 2,000 camp followers	4,000 infantry

Casualties and losses
Light	1,000 killed

The Battle of Ager Falernus was a skirmish during the Second Punic War between the armies of Rome and Carthage. After winning the Battle of Lake Trasimene in Italy in 217 BC, the army commanded by Hannibal marched south and reached Campania. The Carthaginians ultimately moved into the district of Falernum, a fertile river valley surrounded by mountains.

Quintus Fabius Maximus Verrucosus, who had been elected Roman dictator and commander of the Roman field forces after the disastrous defeat at Lake Trasimene, had dogged Hannibal and stuck to a strategy to fight only under favourable conditions. He now occupied all the river crossings and mountain passes leading out of the valley, thus blocking the Carthaginians inside.

After stripping the area of grain, cattle, and other supplies, Hannibal displayed brilliant tactics to provoke the Roman guard to leave one of the passes. Despite the protests of his staff officers, Fabius, who was camped near the pass with his main forces, refused to attack the Carthaginian army and it escaped the trap unscathed.

== Background ==
The Carthaginian victory in the Battle of Lake Trasimene had removed the Roman consular army which had prevented the Carthaginians from marching on Rome. The second Roman consular army in Northern Italy, under Gnaeus Servilius Geminus, was on the other, eastern, side of the Apennine Mountains, near Ariminum, and it was in no position to hinder Hannibal from marching south. This force also had lost most of its reconnaissance capabilities as its cavalry of 4,000 men had been destroyed in an ambush by Hannibal's lieutenant Maharbal possibly near Assisi, immediately after the battle of Lake Trasimene. The Roman army retreated back to Ariminum after this debacle, and was busy checking the Gallic raids taking place near the Po valley. The initiative now rested with Hannibal, and the Romans had temporarily lost the ability to defend their Italian socii allies until a new army could be raised.

=== Hannibal's movement in central Italy ===
Hannibal chose not to march on Rome after the victory at Trasimene. The Carthaginian army instead marched south-east into Umbria, through Perugia, although Livy refers to a failed siege of Spoletum, a Latin colony, Polybius does not mention it, and it is likely that only Carthaginian raiders troubled the Latin colony. Hannibal ordered his men to kill all military-aged males they came across as they marched through Picenum towards the Adriatic coast, reaching Herita 10 days after leaving Lake Trasimene. Here Hannibal rested his army, which was suffering from scurvy, refitted the Libyan/African troops with captured Roman equipment and retrained them, and by using low grade local wine (acetum) as an ointment, brought the cavalry horses back to health. With no Roman army situated near him, Hannibal was free to choose his next course of action unhindered.

== Prelude ==
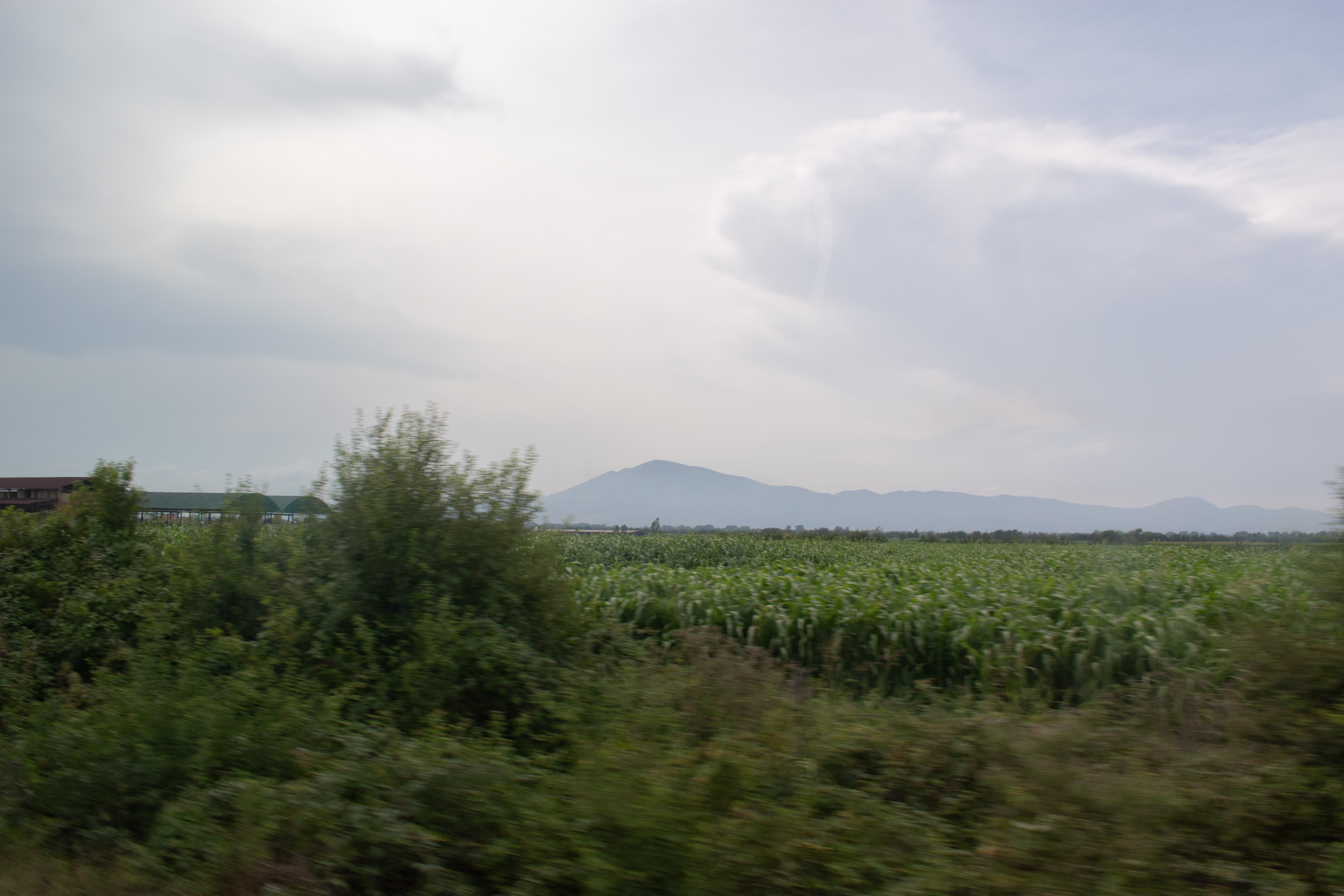
The modern aspect of the area where the battle would have taken place, with Mons Massicus in the background

There was panic and disorder in Rome when rumors about Trasimene spread among the city population, which were confirmed when the praetor Marcus Pomponius curtly announced in the Forum "We have been defeated in a great battle". The Senate met in continual session to debate the next course of action until three days later the news of the defeat of the Roman cavalry by Maharbal arrived in Rome. The Roman senate and the people, realizing the gravity of the situation, decided to elect a dictator (for the first time since 249 BC) to direct the war effort. As one of the elected consuls was dead and the other one away with his army, the dictator was elected by the senate instead of being nominated by one of the consuls.

Quintus Fabius Maximus, a member of the patrician Fabii, who had suggested that an election should be held, was elected into office by the assembled centuries of the people, his term in office being set for the next six months. Fabius, 58 years of age, 28 years older than Hannibal, at that time carried the nickname "Verrucosus" or "Spotty" because of a wart on his face. His past political record was anything but spotty; he had fought in the First Punic War, and had been elected consul in 233 and 228 BC, and was one of the elected censors in 230 BC, and had been granted a triumph for his efforts against the Ligurians. Normally a dictator chose his own deputy, the Master of Horse, but Fabius received as his Master of Horse Marcus Minucius Rufus (a plebeian who was consul in 221 BC), in an unusual political gesture. It was suggested that the post of Fabius was that of a pro-dictator (acting dictator), but it seems Fabius enjoyed all the powers of a dictator during his term.

The Romans needed to prepare a proper reception should Hannibal decided to show up outside Rome with his army. Fabius first set about restoring the morale of the Roman people and then tackled the task of preparing the defences of Rome after receiving his post. He took meticulous care in observing all the religious procedures attached to state affairs and all the civil procedures related to state administration to boost the morale of the city population, after having blamed the Trasimene disaster on the lack of proper religious observations by the dead consul Flaminius. The senate consulted the Sibylline Books at the suggestion of Fabius and a praetor was assigned to appease the Roman gods through generous sacrifices. Divine duties taken care of, Fabius next went about preparing for Hannibal's anticipated visit to Latium, being ignorant of his location and intention at that time.

The city walls were repaired; Minucius raised two Roman legions, their allied contingents, and attached cavalry units to defend the city in nearby Tibur. The unwalled towns in Latium were ordered to be abandoned, and their inhabitants were moved into walled towns. Certain bridges were torn down to deny the Carthaginians easy passage through Latium. Once it was clear that Hannibal was not marching towards Rome, Fabius ordered the army of Servilius into Latium. Fabius left Rome, met and took over command of the army of Servilius near Narnia, or a few miles south at Ocriculum, then joined the army of Minucius at Tibur and marched along the Via Appia into Apulia. Servilus was sent to command the Roman fleet at Ostia with the rank of proconsul. With the Roman army concentrated, Fabius needed to implement the next phase of his plans: how to defeat the Carthaginian army. Fabius in his childhood had been named "Ovicula" (Little Sheep) for his mildness and willingness to follow others about, and in the coming months his activities gave the impression that he was doing his utmost to live up to that nickname.

== A game of prudence and patience ==
Fabius shadows Hannibal’s advance, 217 BC

While the Romans were busy raising an army and sorting out political/religious matters, Hannibal had marched in a leisurely manner south from Hartia. His army, rested, restored to health, retrained, and re-equipped, cut a path of destruction through central Italy as they collected grain, cattle, provisions, and supplies during the march. Hannibal followed the coastal plain before turning west. Near the town of Arpi, the Roman army under Fabius made contact with the Carthaginian army and camped at Aecae, six miles away from the Carthaginian camp. Hannibal drew up his army and offered battle, but Fabius ignored the offer and the Roman army remained in their camp. The stage was set for Fabius to reveal his plans, which would tax the patience of the Romans and the political clout of Fabius to the limit and ultimately be credited by later historians as the most prudent, if economically costly, strategy against the threat of Hannibal.

The following months saw Fabius employ what would later be known as Fabian Strategy, and earn him the title of "The Delayer". Despite whatever provocation Hannibal thought up, the Roman army always refused to fight pitched battles, shadowed the Carthaginians from a distance, manoeuvred to keep to the high ground to deny the Carthaginian cavalry any advantage, and always moved to keep between Rome and their enemy. The Roman army sought to encamp on grounds which were unlikely to be attacked by the Carthaginians, and Roman foragers were covered by flying columns of light infantry and cavalry at all times. Carthaginian foragers and stragglers caught at a disadvantage were cut down whenever possible. With this strategy, Fabius left the initiative to Hannibal and failed to prevent the Carthaginian army from looting and destroying Roman and allied Italian property, but the Roman army gained invaluable combat experience and remained intact, and the threat of intervention by Fabius kept wavering Italian allies from defecting to Carthage. The destruction of a large portion of Roman economic assets tried the patience of the Roman people to the limit.

=== Carthaginians in Ager Falernus ===
After leaving Arpi, Hannibal marched west into Samnium, and then moved to Beneventum, ravaging the countryside at will. Fabius cautiously followed the Carthaginians keeping to the high ground. From Beneventum, which had shut its gates against Hannibal, the Carthaginians moved north to capture a town called either Venosia or Telesia. From this place Hannibal struck south west towards Ager Falernus, a fertile river plain which lay on the south of Latium, and to the north of Capua. After going through Allifae, Callifae, across the Volturnus River to Cales, and then down on the plain the Carthaginians finally arrived near Casilinum. Hannibal let loose his soldiers on the rich land, and all through the summer collected a rich booty of cattle, grain, supplies, and prisoners unhindered by Roman military activity. Hannibal had entered the potential trap because either his Italian guides had mistaken Casinum as Casilinum, or Campanian prisoners had suggested that Capua might defect once Carthaginians reached Campania, which did not materialise at this point of time. It had also been suggested that Hannibal had invaded Ager Falernus to show the Italians the inability of Romans to defend their own property, after failing to get Fabius to fight. There were eight possible routes out of Ager Falernus, but being positioned north of the Volturnus River, and with all the bridges in Roman hands, there were only three that Hannibal could take to leave the river plain. Fabius seized this strategic opportunity presented to him and set about to trap the Carthaginian army.

The Casilinum blunder, 217 BC

=== Hannibal hemmed in ===
Fabius first reinforced the Roman garrison at Casilinum, which guarded one such bridge, and Cales on the south of Ager Falernus. Minucius took up position to the north of the plain to watch both the via Latina and via Appia with a detachment, while Taenum was also garrisoned. The main Roman army camped near Mount Massicus, north of the plain to the west of Minucius, ready to support his position. A detachment of 4,000 troops was sent to watch the passes of Mount Callicula to the east of the plain near Allifae, one of the possible passes through which Hannibal might choose to leave the plain. The exact location is still unknown and remains debatable. Thus, the Roman dispositions hemmed the Carthaginians in the plain, trapping them. It seemed that Hannibal would have to attack a Roman position directly to break out; the only question was whether he would choose such a dangerous manoeuvre before or after his supplies had failed. Fabius had ensured the best possible situation for Rome in his view. All the Romans now had to do was wait until the Carthaginians ran out of supplies and then were forced to take desperate measures.

Hannibal encircled in Campania, 217 BC

Having covered all possible routes Hannibal could take to leave the plain, Fabius sat tight observing the Carthaginian army, but doing nothing to force a decisive engagement. With this strategy Fabius kept his army safe, but his political position began to suffer in Rome. His staff and the Roman senate demanded swift action to crush Hannibal since the Carthaginians were already trapped. When L. Hostilius Mancinus, sent to scout the Numidians with 400 horsemen dared to engage the Carthaginians, he was killed and his entire force destroyed by the Carthaginian cavalry under Carthalo, prompting the Romans to stick to the waiting game for the time being. Fabius in the meantime had visited Rome to perform certain religious duties. The Roman landed rich were feeling the pinch with Hannibal destroying their property, so defending his strategy was another reason for this visit.

== Battle ==
=== Pre-battle situation ===
Hannibal, after his plundering mission was completed, decided to leave the plain, choosing not to winter there. While Fabius, with secure supply lines, had the luxury to sit and wait until his term as dictator expired or the Carthaginians finally attacked him, Hannibal, having stripped the area bare of all supplies, could not afford to stay put indefinitely and ultimately face a supply shortage. The Romans, guided by Fabius, still refused to attack him despite whatever provocation he came up with. Hannibal, on the other hand, did not wish to suffer severe casualties by a head-on assault on the Romans settled in fortified camps on the high ground. Since both commanders sought to fight on favorable conditions, the stalemate continued. The Carthaginian army eventually moved east towards the pass beside Mount Callicula through which they had originally entered the plain. Fabius, anticipating the move, had blocked the pass with 4,000 troops, and encamped on a nearby hill with the main army. Minucius then joined this army with his contingent.

=== Carthaginian preparations ===
Hannibal made careful preparations to break out of the trap, but not through a pitched battle as the Romans had hoped. The day before Hannibal put his plan in motion, he had most of his men eat a hearty supper and go to bed early while leaving the campfires burning. 2,000 oxen from the captured herds were selected, along with 2,000 camp followers to drive the cattle and 2,000 light infantry to guard the unwieldy procession of men and oxen. Dry wood and fagots were tied to the horns of the oxen. An officer called Hasdrubal, in charge of army supplies as his role as Quartermaster general (the same who would later lead the heavy cavalry at Cannae), oversaw the whole operation. Once the preparations were complete, this group was to move towards the pass being guarded by 4,000 Romans. Combat with the Romans or capturing the pass was not to be their objective. There was a saddle below the camp of Fabius to the east, and on the north west of the pass, at the foot of Mount Callicula. The Carthaginian light infantry were to capture and hold the saddle. There is a story recorded by Appian that Hannibal executed 5,000 prisoners so that they would not cause trouble before the march, an incident which is not mentioned by either Polybius or Livy.

Hannibal escapes from Campania, 217 BC

=== Night operations ===
At the appointed time, after the third part of the night had ended, the Carthaginian army roused itself and made ready to march as silently as possible. The chosen force with the oxen marched to the saddle, and when they approached the slopes, the wood tied to the horns were lit by the camp followers. The terrified oxen began to flee and stampede up the slopes of the saddle, creating an illusion of thousands of torches moving up the mountainside. The lights and sounds of the spectacle attracted the attention of the Romans in the camp of Fabius, and also the Roman detachment guarding the pass. The reaction of the forces were different.

Fabius refused to move from his camp despite the pleas of his officers and the urgings of Minucius. The Roman army made ready and stood at arms but did not move out. Fabius did not want to fight a night battle, fearing a Punic trick to draw the Romans into a battle over broken, uneven ground, where Roman infantry would lose their edge as their lines would be broken, and communication would be hampered. Hannibal had previously hoodwinked and destroyed two Roman armies at Trebbia and Trasimene and the cautious Fabius did not want his army to be the third. Thus, although Hannibal still managed to trick the Romans, the Romans only suffered loss of face but not the loss of another army.

The Roman force stationed at the pass, with no Fabius to restrain them, deserted their posts at the head of the pass to attack what they thought was the main Carthaginian army trying to outflank their position and escape across the saddle. As soon as the Romans left their position, Hannibal's main army left camp, with the African infantry leading, the cavalry, the baggage train, and the cattle herds marching in line after them, and Celts and Spanish infantry guarding the rear. The Carthaginian army moved through the pass unmolested, as Fabius did not challenge them. The Roman force attacking the saddle was bewildered when they confronted the lights on the saddle. The cattle ran amok, breaking their lines, the Carthaginian light infantry ambushed them, and a wild melee ensued. As dawn broke to make matters clear, a group of Spanish infantry was seen scaling the saddle walls to join the ongoing pandemonium on the saddle. The Spaniards, being experts in mountain warfare, engaged the now scattered Roman soldiers and killed 1,000 of their number, and managed to rescue the Carthaginian camp followers, the light infantry guard and some of the cattle well before the main Roman army could intervene.

== Aftermath ==
The political clout of Fabius began to wane after this incident, as displeasure with his tactics grew in Rome. Hannibal, after escaping from the trap he had got himself into, marched east towards Apulia, ravaging the Roman estates at will. Fabius cautiously followed him still keeping to the Fabian strategy. He would order towns burned, and crops destroyed in the path of Hannibal. The scorched earth policy was designed to hamper the movement of the Carthaginian army, which, unlike the Roman one, did not have a secure supply chain and had to live off the land. The prudence of this tactic may have hampered the Carthaginians but the Romans were pushed to the limit of their patience because of this. Hannibal marched east through Samnium into Apulia, and selected the town of Geronium as his winter base.

=== Analysis ===
The battle itself was smaller in scale when compared to the Battle of Ticinus. Although Fabius was not duped by Hannibal's moves, his blocking force at the pass was. Leonard Cottrell, in his book Hannibal: Enemy of Rome, wrote that the trick was designed to be recognized by Fabius as a trick. Hannibal had studied the mind of his opponent, and devised a plan to make him do exactly what Hannibal needed him to do. Fabius thought Hannibal was trying to get him to fight a night action over broken, uneven ground, where Roman infantry would lose their greatest advantages of discipline and teamwork, as their formations would become disorganized. Since Hannibal was choosing the battle ground and the hour, he might have sprung other surprises to gain further advantages on the Romans. Fabius predictably did what Hannibal had anticipated: nothing. The Romans guarding the pass, with no Fabius to keep them in check, thought they were doing their job when they rushed out, preventing a Carthaginian escape. Again, they acted as Hannibal had anticipated, and the Carthaginians took advantage of their actions to escape.

It seems both commanders here were following one of the observations of Sun Tzu, "A battle avoided cannot be lost". Fabius, who had avoided fighting a pitched battle with Hannibal because he now held the upper hand, faced Hannibal, who now had to avoid a pitched battle, because he would have to assault fortified Roman positions directly. B. H. Liddell Hart observed in his books Strategy and Great Captains Unveiled that successful generals normally understand the concept of economy of force and the value of indirect approach, and also the implications of another Sun Tzu observation, "Know your enemy and know yourself, and victory will be yours". Hannibal demonstrated all these factors in planning, implementing and orchestrating this small but significant episode. A night operation is always hazardous, and requires a certain amount of discipline and administrative control, which was superbly demonstrated by the Carthaginians.

== Bibliography ==
- Bagnall, Nigel (1990). The Punic Wars. Macmillan. ISBN 0-312-34214-4.
- Cottrell, Leonard (1992). Hannibal: Enemy of Rome. Da Capo Press. ISBN 0-306-80498-0.
- Lazenby, John Francis (1978). Hannibal's War. Aris & Phillips. ISBN 0-85668-080-X.
- Goldsworthy, Adrian (2003). The Fall of Carthage. Cassel Military Paperbacks. ISBN 0-304-36642-0.
- Peddie, John (2005). Hannibal's War. Sutton Publishing Limited. ISBN 0-7509-3797-1.
- Lancel, Serge (1999). Hannibal. Blackwell Publishers. ISBN 0-631-21848-3.
- Baker, G. P. (1999). Hannibal. Cooper Square Press. ISBN 0-8154-1005-0.
