= Gothic revolt of Anaolsus =

- Part of Fall of the Roman Empire; Gothic wars
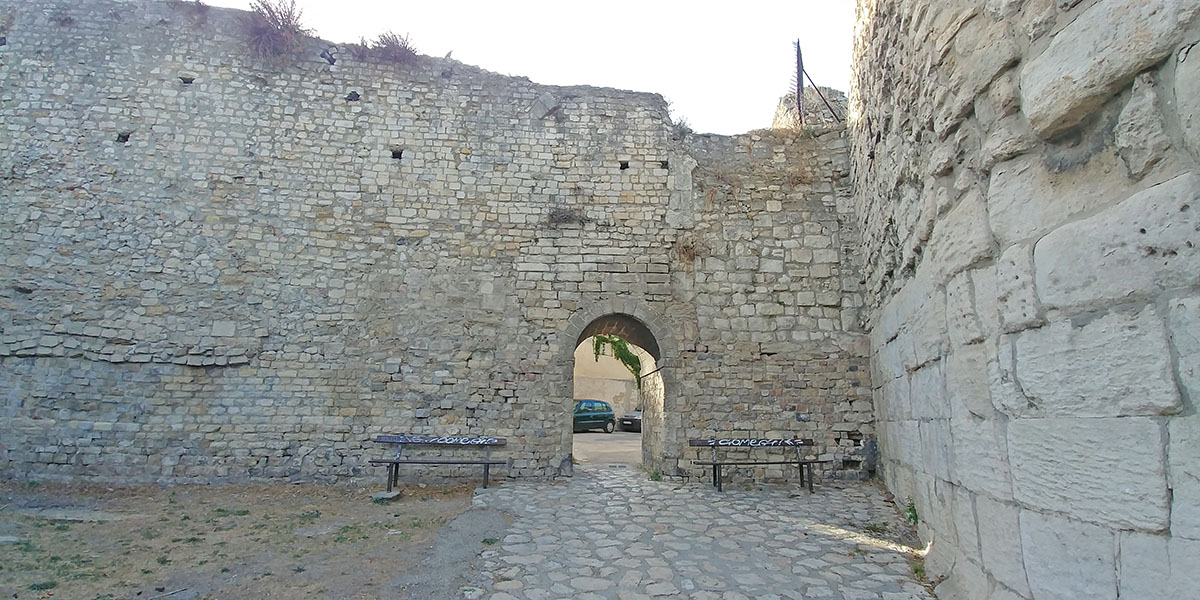
- Roman city wal of Arles
Date	430
Location	near Arles

Belligerents
Aquitanian Goths	Western Roman Empire

Commanders and leaders
Anaolsus	Aetius

Strength
± 2.000-3.000	

The Gothic Revolt of Anaolsus was an internal conflict in the Western Roman Empire in 430. The conflict took place in southern Gaul where Gothic auxiliary forces of the comitatenses under the leadership of Anaolsus had revolted and threatened to take possession of the city of Arles an important administrative center. In response, the Romans sent the army of Aetius to put down the revolt.

== Primary sources ==
The uprising is only mentioned in the Chronicon of Hydatius, a 5th-century bishop and chronicler from Gallaecia (present-day northwestern Spain) and indirectly by Merobaudes. Hydatius describes that a Gothic leader, named Anaolsus, was defeated by Aëtius near Arles in 430, more data is missing. Merobaudes focuses his panegyrical on Aetius and describes how he defended the city against a Germanic attack. In addition to Hydatius and Merobaudes, the Gallic Chronicle of 452 and the writings of Prosper provide additional information about the period, but do not provide a detailed description of the fights.

== Background and interpretation ==
Several historians have shed their light on this history and tried to turn the single event and the loose chunks of information into a coherent whole. Peter Heather analyzes the attack of the Goths on Arles in 430 in two publications. He emphasizes that this took place during a period of political instability within the Western Roman Empire. Their uprising happened in the context of the waning power of the Western Roman Empire and the internal conflicts within the Roman army and the Senate. Boniface' campaign against the Vandals ran like a common thread through this. On the background played the rivalry between Aetius and Flavius Felix, erupted because Aëtius had to give up part of his force before the war against the Vandals.

Historians such as Peter Heather point to the independence of certain Gothic comitatus (military units) during this period. Between 418 and 439, these units sometimes undertook independent military actions, negotiating directly with Roman authorities, separate from central royal authority.

The Gothic Rex Theodoric is not mentioned in the surviving sources. His role during the events is unknown, but he had every interest in increasing the Gothic influence in Gaul as earlier became apparent during his revolt in 425-426. The attack on Arles fits into this view, the possession of this important city was a strategic move to control South Gaul, which made it a repeated target for Gothic attacks.

== Prelude ==
In 429, the crossing of the Vandals, established in the Diocese of Hispania, to North Africa had resulted in a new dangerous war front. The danger of losing its richest provinces caused the Romans to prepare for urgently sending troops from Italy . This would have reduced also the number of troops in Gaul. The outbreak of uprisings in Gaul and Raetia by groups of Bagaudae, aggravated by an invasion of the Juthungi north of the Alps caused a new threat. The under-manned Roman army in Gaul was not authorized to take adequate action against this.

== The rebellion ==
The circumstances must have been an ideal breeding ground for Anoalsus to start a revolt as leader of the Gothic auxiliary. As on other occasions in the history of the empire, the military crisis situation encouraged to take up arms and, as is often the case, enforcing better conditions for providing military services to the Roman army was the possible cause. It is unknown how large Anoalsus's army was, but it must have been large enough for Aëtius to go to war against him on his own. Some of several thousand therefore seem to be in place here.

=== Battle near Arles ===
The Gothic rebels moved up to conquer Arles. The capital of the Praetorian prefecture of Gaul was a political and military goal. Possession of it was essential for those who wanted to control Gaul. If one keeps the order of Hydatius's events, Aëtius campaigned against the Goths of Anaolsus in early spring, before focusing on the Juthungi and Nori. Near the city, he clashed with the rebels and managed to defeat them convincingly by capturing Anoalsus.

== Aftermate ==
The victory over Anaolsus meant a huge boost for Aëtius. He had managed to eliminate a rival with an army in a strategic area and this contributed to his emergence as the dominant military figure in the West. After this, he focused on the Juthungi and Nori, and led a campaign in the Alps. During this campaign he turned against Felix and had him killed.

== Bibliography ==
- Wijnendaele, Jeroen W.P. (2017), The early career of Aëtius and the murder of Felix, Historia: Zeitschrift für Alte Geschichte 66
- Peter Heather (2000), The Visigots from the Migration Period to the Seventh Century: An Ethnographic Perspective, Boydell & Brewer Inc.
- Peter Heather (1992). The Emergence of Visigothic Kingdom in Drinkwater, J. en Elton, H. (eds.): Fifth-Century Gaul: A Crisis of Identity?, Cambridge
