= 438 =

438 in various calendars
- Gregorian calendar: 438; CDXXXVIII
- Ab urbe condita: 1191
- Assyrian calendar: 5188
- Balinese saka calendar: 359–360
- Bengali calendar: −156 – −155
- Berber calendar: 1388
- Buddhist calendar: 982
- Burmese calendar: −200
- Byzantine calendar: 5946–5947
- Chinese calendar: 丁丑年 (Fire Ox); 3135 or 2928 — to — 戊寅年 (Earth Tiger); 3136 or 2929
- Coptic calendar: 154–155
- Discordian calendar: 1604
- Ethiopian calendar: 430–431
- Hebrew calendar: 4198–4199
- Hindu calendars
- Vikram Samvat: 494–495
- Shaka Samvat: 359–360
- Kali Yuga: 3538–3539
- Holocene calendar: 10438
- Iranian calendar: 184 BP – 183 BP
- Islamic calendar: 190 BH – 189 BH
- Javanese calendar: 322–323
- Julian calendar: 438; CDXXXVIII
- Korean calendar: 2771
- Minguo calendar: 1474 before ROC 民前1474年
- Nanakshahi calendar: −1030
- Seleucid era: 749/750 AG
- Thai solar calendar: 980–981
- Tibetan calendar: མེ་མོ་གླང་ལོ་ (female Fire-Ox); 564 or 183 or −589 — to — ས་ཕོ་སྟག་ལོ་ (male Earth-Tiger); 565 or 184 or −588

Year 438 (CDXXXVIII) was a common year starting on Saturday of the Julian calendar. At the time, it was known as the Year of the Consulship of Theodosius and Glabrio (or, less frequently, year 1191 Ab urbe condita). The denomination 438 for this year has been used since the early medieval period, when the Anno Domini calendar era became the prevalent method in Europe for naming years.

== Events ==
=== By place ===
==== Byzantium ====
- Emperor Theodosius II forbids the divulging of secrets of naval carpentry, probably to avoid its spread to the rising Vandal power in North Africa.
- February 15 – The Codex Theodosianus, a collection of edicts of Roman law, is published.
- Aelia Eudocia, wife of Theodosius II, goes on a pilgrimage to Jerusalem, bringing back with her holy relics to prove her faith.

==== Europe ====
- The last gladiatorial fights are held in the Colosseum in Rome.
- King Hermeric of the Suebic Kingdom of Galicia is forced to retire after a seven-year illness. He hands the government over to his son Rechila.
- In the Gothic War (436-439) besieges Flavius Aetius over the Visigoths in the Battle of Mons Colubrarius.

==== Persia ====
- Bahram V dies after an 18-year reign as Sassanid king of the Persian Empire. He is succeeded by his son Yazdegerd II.

=== By topic ===
==== Religion ====
- Relics of John Chrysostom are transported to Constantinople.

== Births ==
- Basina, queen of Thuringia (approximate date)
- Epiphanius, bishop of Pavia (d. 496)

== Deaths ==
- Bahram V, king of the Persian Empire
- Feng Hong, last emperor of Northern Yan
