= Flavius Aetius =

Roman general and statesman (c. 390 – 454)

Flavius Aetius dux et patricius
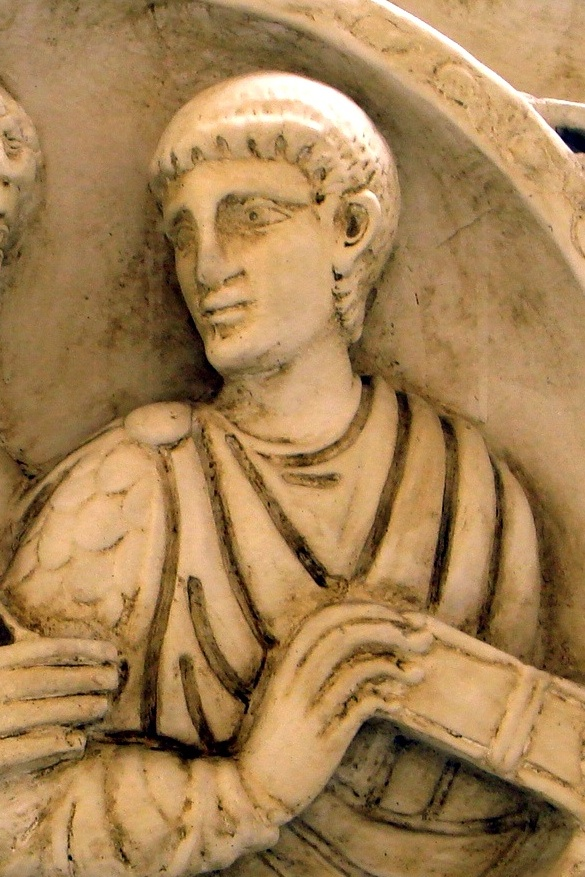
- Possible relief of Aetius, although this sarcophagus has also been thought to depict Stilicho (d. 408), and can be dated even earlier (between 387–390), during the reign of Theodosius I
- Born: c. 390; Durostorum, Roman Empire
- Died: 21 September 454 (aged c. 64); Ravenna, Roman Italy, Western Roman Empire
- Cause of death: Murdered by Valentinian III and Heraclius
- Resting place: Unknown, possibly the Sarcophagus of Stilicho
- Other name: Last of the Romans
- Occupation: General
- Office: Consul
- Children: Carpilio, Gaudentius, a daughter (possibly)
- Military career
- Years: 425–454
- Rank: Magister militum per Gallias (425-429); Magister militum (429-454)
- Battles: Siege of Arles; Frankish War (428); Vandal conquest of Roman Africa (429-432) 430 campaign in Raetia; Battle of Rimini; Frankish War (431-432); Battle of Arles; Second Bagaudae Revolt; Burgundian War (435); Siege of Narbona (436); Battle of Mons Colubrarius; Gothic War (436-439) Vandal War (439-442); Battle of Vicus Helena; Siege of Orléans (451); Battle of the Catalaunian Plains; Hunnic invasion of Italy

Flavius Aetius (Note: By the late 4th century, "Flavius" had become a courtesy title used for almost all high-profile men of the Empire.) (also spelled Aëtius; (Note: The ae in Latin Aetius was disyllabic, not diphthongal.) Latin: [aːˈɛtiʊs]; c. 390 – 21 September 454) was a Roman general and statesman of the closing period of the Western Roman Empire. He was a military commander and the most influential man in the Empire for two decades (433–454). He managed policy in regard to the attacks of barbarian federates settled throughout the West. Notably, he mustered a large Roman and allied (foederati) army in the Battle of the Catalaunian Plains, ending an invasion of Gaul by Attila in 451, though Attila and his subjugated allies still managed to invade Italy the following year, an incursion best remembered for the Sack of Aquileia and the intercession of Pope Leo I. In 454, Aetius was assassinated by the emperor Valentinian III.

Aetius has often been called the "Last of the Romans". Edward Gibbon refers to him as "the man universally celebrated as the terror of Barbarians and the support of the Republic" for his victory at the Catalaunian Plains. J. B. Bury notes, "That he was the one prop and stay of the Western Empire during his life time was the unanimous verdict of his contemporaries."

== Biography ==
=== Origins and family ===
Aetius was born at Durostorum in Moesia Secunda (modern Silistra, Bulgaria), roughly around 390, as he was described as a "young adolescent" in 405. His father, Gaudentius, was a Roman general and described as a native of the province of Scythia. Aetius's mother, whose name is unknown, was a wealthy aristocratic woman of ancestry from Rome or some other city in the Italian peninsula. Before 425 Aetius married the daughter of Carpilio, who gave him a son, also named Carpilio. Later he married Pelagia, widow of Bonifacius, from whom he had a son, Gaudentius. It is possible that he also had a daughter, whose husband, Thraustila, avenged Aetius's death by killing emperor Valentinian III.

=== Early years and service under Joannes ===
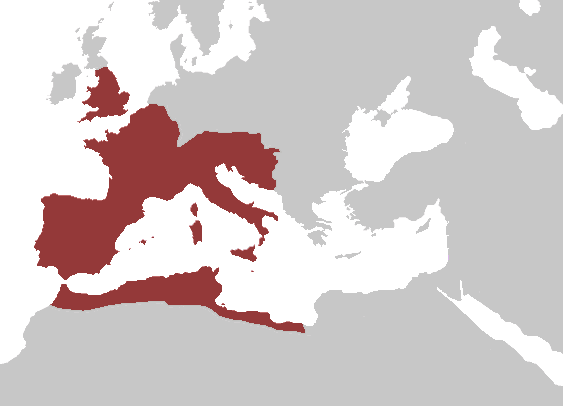
Western Roman Empire in 395

As a boy, Aetius was at the service of the imperial court, enrolled in the military unit of the Protectores Domestici and then elevated to the position of tribunus praetorianus partis militaris, setting him up for future political eligibility. Between 405 and 408 he was kept as hostage at the court of Alaric I, king of the Visigoths. In 408 Alaric asked to keep Aetius as a hostage, but was refused, as Aetius was sent to the court of Uldin, king of the Huns, where he would stay throughout much of the reign of Charaton, Uldin's successor. Some modern historians have suggested that Aetius's upbringing amongst militaristic peoples gave him a martial vigour not common in contemporary Roman generals.

In 423 the Western Emperor Honorius died. The most influential man in the West, Castinus, chose as his successor Joannes, a high-ranking officer. Joannes was not a member of the Theodosian dynasty so he was not recognized by the eastern court. The Eastern Emperor Theodosius II organised a military expedition westward, led by Ardaburius and his son Aspar, to put his cousin, the young Valentinian III (who was a nephew of Honorius), on the western throne. Aetius entered the service of the usurper as cura palatii and was sent by Joannes to ask the Huns for assistance. Joannes lacked a strong army and fortified himself in his capital, Ravenna, where he was killed in the summer of 425. Shortly afterwards, Aetius returned to Italy with a large force of Huns to find that power in the west was now in the hands of Valentinian III and his mother Galla Placidia. After fighting against Aspar's army, Aetius managed to compromise with Galla Placidia. He sent back his army of Huns and in return obtained the rank of comes et magister militum per Gallias, the commander in chief of the Roman army in Gaul.

=== First Gallic campaigns ===
In 426, Aetius arrived in southern Gaul and took command of the field army. At that time Arelate, an important city in Narbonensis near the mouth of the Rhone, was under siege from the Visigoths, led by their king Theodoric I. Aetius defeated Theodoric, lifted the siege of Arelate, and drove the Visigoths back to their holdings in Aquitania.

In 428, he fought the Salian Franks, defeating their king Chlodio and recovering some territory they had occupied along the Rhine. In 429 he was elevated to the rank of magister militum; this was probably the junior of the two offices of comes et magister utriusque militiae, as the senior is known to have been the patrician Flavius Constantinus Felix, the most influential man in those years, and a supporter of Galla Placidia.

Begin 430 the Goths led by Anaolsus attacked Arelate again but were defeated by Aetius.

In May 430, Aetius and the Army accused Felix of plotting against him and some sources believe Aetius had him, his wife, and a deacon killed. Once Felix was dead, Aetius was the highest ranking amongst the magistri militiae, even if he had not yet been granted the title of patricius or the senior command. During 430 and 431 Aetius was in Raetia and Noricum, re-establishing Roman rule on the Danubian Limes, campaigning against the Juthungi and defeating the Bagaudae in Augusta Vindelicorum. In 431 he returned to Gaul, where he received Hydatius, bishop of Aquae Flaviae, who complained about the attacks of the Suebes. Aetius then defeated the Franks, recapturing Tournacum and Cambriacum. He then sent Hydatius back to the Suebes in Hispania.

=== War with Bonifacius ===
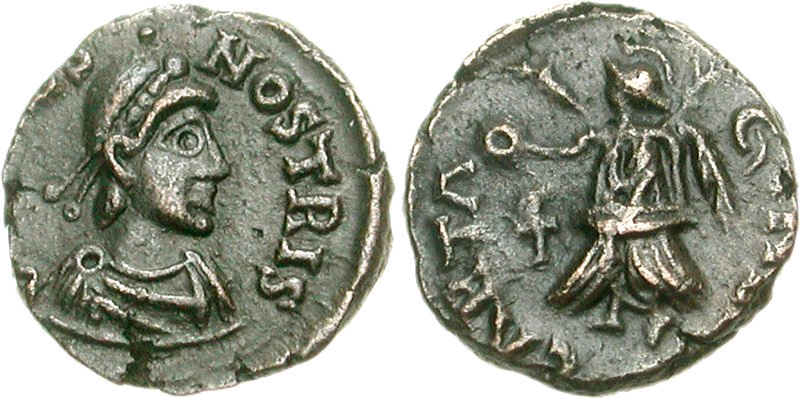
Coin of Bonifacius Comes Africae (422–431 CE).

While Aetius was campaigning in Gaul, there was an ongoing power struggle among Aetius, Felix, Bonifacius, and the emperor Valentinian's mother and regent Galla Placidia. In 427 while Bonifacius was away as governor (comes) of Africa, Felix caused him to fall into disfavour with Placidia. Bonifacius was eventually returned to favor by Placidia, but only after Felix had sent Sigisvult and two other armies against him when Aetius warned him of Felix's intentions. In 429, the Vandals exploited this power struggle and crossed over to Africa.

After the execution of Felix in 430, Aetius and Bonifacius remained as the empire's most influential generals, both constantly vying for the favor of Placidia. In 432 Aetius held the consulate, but Bonifacius was recalled to Italy and received warmly by Placidia. Bonifacius was given the rank of patrician and made the senior comes et magister utriusque militiae, while Aetius was stripped of his military command. Aetius, believing his fall now imminent, marched against Bonifacius and fought him at the Battle of Rimini. Bonifacius won the battle but was mortally wounded, dying a few months later. Aetius escaped to Pannonia and traveled to the court of his friend, Rugila, the king of the Huns. With their help he returned to power, receiving the title of comes et magister utriusque militiae. Aetius then had Bonifacius's son-in-law, Sebastianus, who had succeeded Bonifacius as magister militum, exiled from Italy to Constantinople, bought the properties of Bonifacius, and married his widow Pelagia.

=== Campaigns against Burgundians, Bagaudae, and Visigoths ===
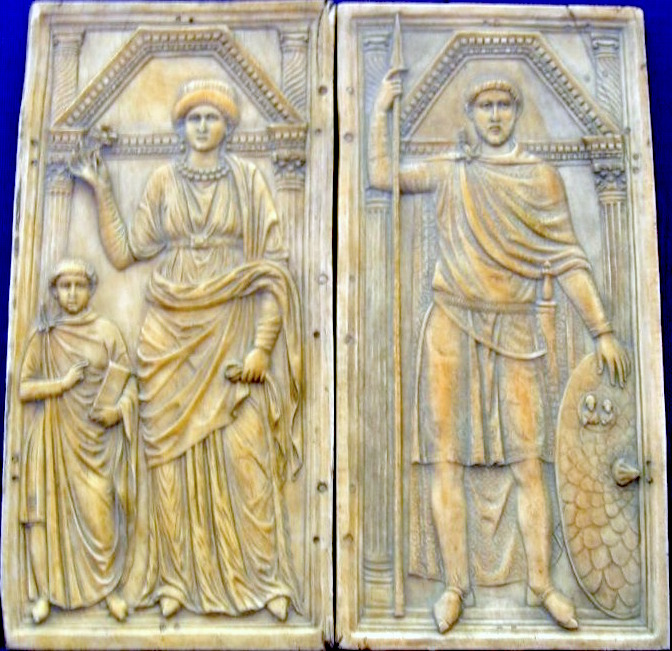
The Monza Cathedral Diptych, which may have been commissioned on Aetius's first consulship. It may also depict Stilicho.

From 433 to 450, Aetius was the dominant figure in the Western Empire, obtaining the rank of magnificus vir parens patriusque noster (5 September 435) and playing the role of "protector" of Galla Placidia and Valentinian III while the Emperor was still young. At the same time he continued to devote attention to Gaul. In 436, the Burgundians of King Gundahar were defeated and obliged to accept peace by Aetius and Avitus; however, the following year he sent Hun foederati to destroy them. Allegedly 20,000 Burgundians were killed in a slaughter which probably became the basis of the Nibelungenlied, a German epic. That same year Aetius was probably in Armorica with Litorius to suppress a rebellion of the Bagaudae under their leader Tibatto. The year 437 saw his second consulship and the wedding of Valentinian and Licinia Eudoxia in Constantinople; it is probable that Aetius attended the ceremony that marked the restoration of the direct rule of the Emperor. At that time his general Litorius had broken the siege of Narbona and had turned the war in favor of the Romans. The following two years were occupied by a campaign against the Suebi and by the war against the Visigoths; in 438 Aetius won a major battle (probably the Battle of Mons Colubrarius), but in 439 the Visigoths defeated and killed Litorius and his Hun Foederati. Aetius returned to Gaul after Vetericus had stabilized the situation, and defeated the Visigoths and obtained a treaty. On his return to Italy, he was honoured by a statue erected by the Senate and the People of Rome by order of the Emperor; this was probably the occasion for the panegyric written by Merobaudes.

In 443, Aetius settled the remaining Burgundians in Sapaudia, south of Lake Geneva. His most pressing concern in the 440s was with problems in Gaul and Iberia, mainly with the Bagaudae. He settled the Alans around Valence in 440 and along the Loire including Aurelianum in 442 to contain unrest in Armorica.

In Spain, Aetius was slowly losing his grip on the situation. In 441 he appointed Asturius Magister Militum per Hispanias, in order to put down the Bagaudae in Tarraconensis. He was recalled and Merobaudes defeated the Bagaudae of Aracellitanus in 443. In 445 the Romans had the Vandals attack Turonium in Gallaecia, followed by Vitus who campaigned with a combined force of Romans and Goths in 446, but was ultimately defeated.

The Bagaudae in Armorica revolted again under their leader Eudoxiusin 447 or 448, and were put down by the Alans of Goar. As a result, Eudoxius fled to the court of Attila the Hun. In 449 the Bagaudae in Spain revolted and sacked Tyriasso, Caesaragusta, and Illerdensus. The Suebi also entered Tarraconensis to assist Basilius and his revolt.

In 445 Majorian defeated a Frankish siege of Turonum, which was followed by a Frankish attack under Clodio in the region of Atrebatum, in Belgica Secunda. The foederati were stopped in an ambush near Vicus Helena, where Aetius directed the operations while his commander Majorian (later Emperor) fought with the cavalry. However, by 450 Aetius had already returned to good terms with the Franks. In 449 Chlodio died, and the patricius supported his younger son Merovaeus's claim to the throne. Aetius adopted him as his own son and sent him from Rome, where he had been an ambassador, to the Frankish court with many presents.

=== Hun invasions of Gaul and Italy ===
The possible path of the Hun forces in their invasion of Gaul, leading up to the Battle of the Catalaunian Plains

Before 449 Aetius had signed an agreement with the Huns, allowing some of them to settle in Pannonia, along the Sava River; he also sent to Attila, the king of the Huns, a man called Constantius as a secretary. In 449, Attila was angry over an alleged theft of a golden plate, and Aetius sent him an embassy under Romulus to calm him; Attila sent him a dwarf, Zerco, as a present, whom Aetius gave back to his original owner, Aspar.

However, the good terms between Romans and Huns did not last, as Attila wanted to attack Roman Gaul; he knew that Aetius was a serious obstacle to his enterprise, and tried to have him removed, but in 451, when the Huns attacked, Aetius was still the commander of the Roman army in Gaul. The large Hunno-German army captured several cities, and proceeded towards Aurelianum.

Aetius, with the help of the influential Gallo-Roman senator Avitus, convinced the Visigoths of king Theodoric I to join him against the external menace; he also succeeded in persuading Sambida (who was falsely accused of planning to join the Huns), the Armoricans, the Salian Franks, some of the Saxons, and the Burgundians of Sapaudia to join his forces. Then the joint Roman and Visigothic army moved to relieve the besieged city of Aurelianum, forcing the Huns to abandon the siege and retreat to open country.

On 20 June 451 Aetius and Theodoric engaged Attila and his allies at the Battle of the Catalaunian Plains. Theodoric died in the battle, and Aetius suggested his son Thorismund retreat to Tolosa to secure his throne, and persuaded Merovaeus to return to the lands of the Franks; for this reason it is said that Aetius kept all of the battlefield loot for his army.

Attila returned in 452 to again press his claim of marriage to Honoria; Aetius was unable to block Attila's advance through the Julian Alps. Instead, he chose to garrison Aquileia against Attila's onslaught. Attila invaded and ravaged Italy, sacking numerous cities and razing Aquileia completely, allegedly leaving no trace of it behind. Valentinian III fled from the court at Ravenna to Rome; Aetius remained in the field but lacked the strength to offer battle, instead positioning his army at Bononia to block the roads through the Apennines to Ravenna and Rome. Edward Gibbon however says Aetius never showed his greatness more clearly in managing to harass and slow Attila's advance with only a shadow force. Attila finally halted at the Po, where he met an embassy including the prefect Trygetius, the ex-consul Gennadius Avienus, and Pope Leo I. After the meeting he turned his army back, having gained neither Honoria's hand nor the territories he desired. Ancient and medieval historians tended to give Pope Leo and supernatural forces credit for halting Attila, but a number of practical factors may have also induced Attila to retreat: his army was unable to obtain sufficient food and was suffering from disease, Aetius's army was busy harassing the Huns, and finally Marcian had sent forces north of the Danube to attack the homelands of the Huns and their vassals under a separate Aetius.

=== Assassination ===
Although in 453 Aetius had been able to betroth his son Gaudentius to Valentinian's daughter Placidia, Valentinian felt intimidated by Aetius, who some 30 years prior had supported Joannes against him and who, Valentinian believed, wanted to place his son on the throne. The Roman senator Petronius Maximus and the chamberlain Heraclius were therefore able to enlist Valentinian in a plot to assassinate Aetius. The ancient historian Priscus of Panium reports that on 21 September 454, while Aetius was at court in Ravenna delivering a financial account, Valentinian suddenly leaped from his seat and declared that he would no longer be the victim of Aetius's drunken depravities. He held Aetius responsible for the empire's troubles and accused him of trying to steal the empire from him. When Aetius attempted to defend himself from the charges, Valentinian drew his sword and together with Heraclius, struck Aetius on the head, killing him instantly. Later, when Valentinian boasted that he had done well in disposing of Aetius, someone at court responded, "Whether well or not, I do not know. But know that you have cut off your right hand with your left." Edward Gibbon credits Sidonius Apollinaris with this famous observation.

Maximus expected to be made patrician in place of Aetius, but was blocked by Heraclius. Seeking revenge, Maximus arranged with two Huns who were friends of Aetius, Optila and Thraustila, to assassinate both Valentinian III and Heraclius. On 16 March 455, Optila stabbed the emperor in the temple as he dismounted in the Campus Martius and prepared for a session of archery practice. As the stunned emperor turned to see who had struck him, Optila finished him off with another thrust of his blade. Meanwhile, Thraustila stepped forward and killed Heraclius. Most of the soldiers standing close by had been faithful followers of Aetius, and none lifted a hand to save the emperor.

== Legacy ==
=== Military legacy ===
Aetius is generally viewed as a great military commander – indeed, he was held in such high esteem by the Eastern Roman Empire that he became known as the last true Roman of the west. Traditionally, historians also consider the Battle of the Catalaunian Plains as decisively important, crippling Attila by destroying his aura of invincibility. Gibbon states this view:

[Attila's] retreat across the Rhine confessed the last victory which was achieved in the name of the Western Roman Empire.

Aetius effectively ruled the western empire from 433 to 454, and attempted to stabilize its European borders under a deluge of barbarians, foremost of which were Attila and the Huns. One of his greatest achievements was the assembling of the coalition against Attila. Regarding this, historian Arther Ferrill states:

After he secured the Rhine, Attila moved into central Gaul and put Orléans under siege. Had he gained his objective, he would have been in a strong position to subdue the Visigoths in Aquitaine, but Aetius had put together a formidable coalition against the Hun. The Roman leader had built a powerful alliance of Visigoths, Alans and Burgundians, uniting them with their traditional enemy, the Romans, for the defense of Gaul. Even though all parties to the protection of the Western Roman Empire had a common hatred of the Huns, it was still a remarkable achievement on Aetius's part to have drawn them into an effective military relationship.

While J. B. Bury viewed Aetius as a great military commander and a prominent historical figure, he did not consider the battle itself to be particularly decisive. He argues that Aetius attacked the Huns when they were already retreating from Orléans (so the danger to Gaul was departing anyway); and he declined to renew the attack on the Huns next day, precisely in order to preserve the balance of power. (Others suggest that the Huns may have abandoned the siege of Orléans because Aetius's armies were advancing on them.) Bury suggests that the Germanic victory over the Huns at the Battle of Nedao, three years later, was more important. This determined that there would be no long-term Hun empire in Europe, which Bury thinks would have been unlikely even if they had crushed the Germanic tribes on that occasion. For Bury, the result of the Battle of the Catalaunian Plains determined chiefly that Attila spent his last year looting Italy, rather than Gaul.

Modern authors typically overlook the battle and focus on the greater impact of Aetius's career, and he is generally seen as one of the greatest Roman military commanders of all time, as well as an excellent diplomat and administrator. Meghan McEvoy states that the Battle of the Catalaunian Plains is more a testament to his political aptitude than his military skill due to his foresight in the ability to provision treaties and obligations. John Julius Norwich caustically referred to the assassination of Valentinian III by his own guards as an act that Valentinian brought on himself by his foolish execution of Aetius, the "Empire's greatest commander." Hugh Elton notes that Aetius and his army were one of the most effective Roman armies to have existed, with its speed and mobility pointing to a highly efficient logistical and manpower resupply system not directly evidenced by the sources. It is generally seen that the rapid fragmentation and collapse of the West after his death was a testament to his ability to hold the empire together.

=== Controversies ===
Aetius's legacy has been filled with controversy somewhat similar to that of Stilicho as both left the Empire significantly weaker when they died. Like Stilicho's critics pointing towards his inability or unwillingness to deal with usurpation in Britain, Gaul and Spain, and the Rhine crossing of 406, critics of Aetius point towards the civil wars of 427–433 that allowed for the Vandal crossing to Africa and its eventual loss, and Aetius's inability to retake Carthage. Hughes attempts to address this, pointing out that Felix was responsible for the war that allowed for the Vandal crossing, and that the Romans did attempt to deal with it on several occasions, including Bonifacius in 429–432, Aspar in 430–435, and Aetius in 441. Heather states that the rise of Attila ultimately led to the loss of Africa as the Eastern Roman army and navy, which was bearing the brunt of the cost for the expedition, had to be recalled to the Balkans. Halsall argues that the black mark on Aetius's career was his mixed success in Spain, where the majority of the province was lost by 449, although he later rectified this. Hughes states that:

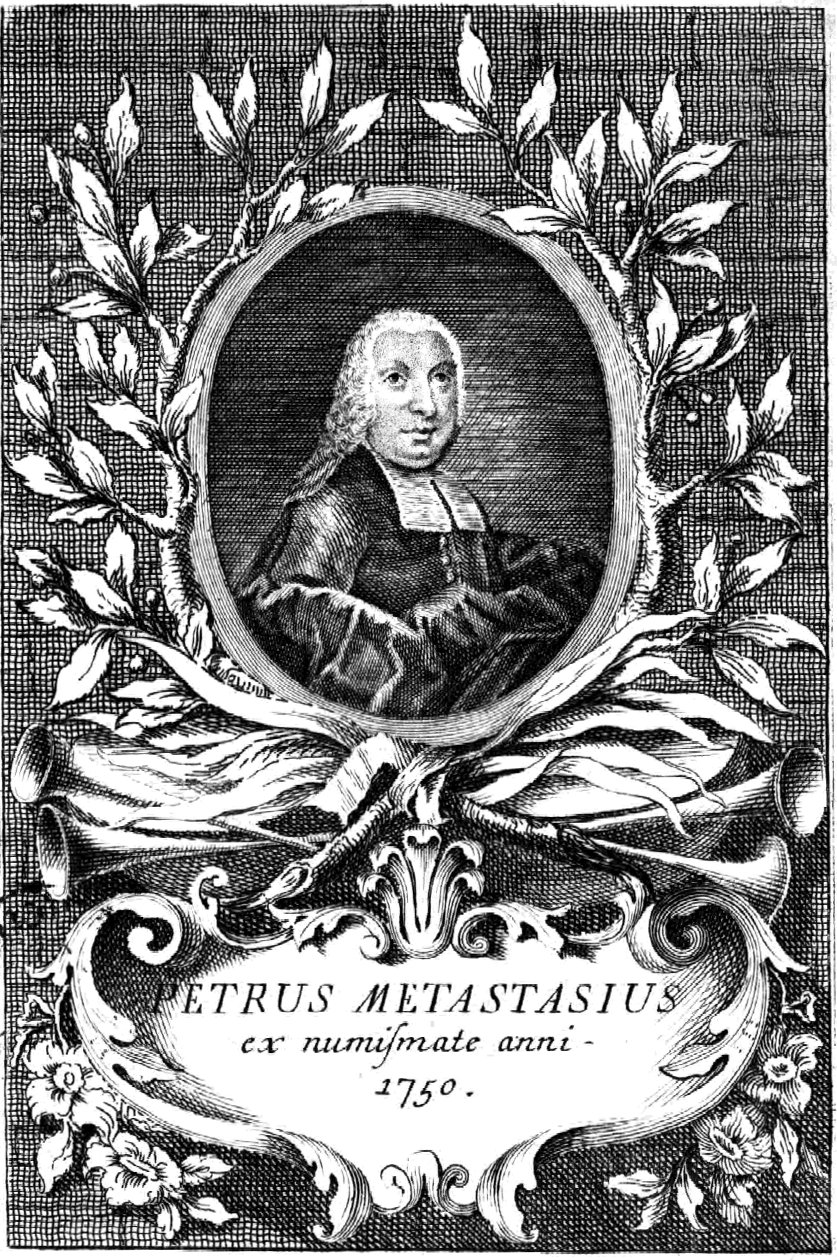
Title page of the Ezio libretto, 1765 edition, with a portrait of author Pietro Metastasio

Stilicho and Aetius, who certainly knew each other, although they were from different generations, were responding to the specific, and vastly different, problems with which they were faced. Neither could find all of the answers.

=== In popular culture ===
Aetius appears in several popular works of historical fiction, usually as a foil for Attila the Hun. The earliest known appearance is in 1728, in the libretto Ezio (the Italian variation of Aetius). This libretto, in which Ezio becomes involved in a plot to kill Attilla, has been set to music by several different composers. Verdi's 1846 opera Attila tells the same story, though with a different libretto.

The struggle between Aetius and Attila is also depicted in Thomas B. Costain's 1959 novel The Darkness and the Dawn and William Napier's Attila trilogy. Polish writer Teodor Parnicki wrote a historical novel Aetius, the Last Roman (1937).

In the 1954 Italian-French film production Attila, Scourge of God, Aetius is portrayed by Henri Vidal. In the 2001 American TV Miniseries Attila, Aetius is portrayed by Powers Boothe as a former mentor and friend to Attila who becomes his nemesis. At the same time, he is depicted as the only general capable of keeping the empire standing and facing Attila as an equal.

== See also ==
- Aetia gens
- Late Roman army

== Primary sources ==
- Additamenta ad chron. Prosperi Hauniensis
- Annales Ravennates
- Cassiodorus, Chronica and Variae
- Chronica gallica anno 452
- Chronica gallica anno 511
- Chronicon Paschale
- Gregory of Tours, Historia Francorum ii.8, gives a condensed version of Aetius's character and career, using a lost history of Renatus Profuturus Frigeridus.
- Hydatius, Chronicle
- John of Antioch, Chronicle
- John Malalas, Chronographia
- Jordanes, Getica and Romana
- Marcellinus Comes, Chronicle
- Merobaudes, Carmina and Panegyrici
- Philostorgius, Ecclesiastical History
- Priscus, Fragmentary History
- Procopius, Vandal War
- Prosper of Aquitaine, Epitoma chronicon
- Sidonius Apollinaris, Carmina
- Suda
- Zosimus, New Histories

== Secondary sources ==
- Bury, John Bagnall (1923). History of the Later Roman Empire. Dover Books.
- Given, John (2014). The Fragmentary History of Priscus: Attila, the Huns and the Roman Empire, AD 430–476. Arx Publishing. ISBN 978-1-935228-14-1.
- Hughes, Ian (2012). Aetius: Attila's Nemesis. Barnsley: Pen & Sword Military. ISBN 978-1783461349.
- Jones, A. H. M.; Martindale, J. R.; Morris, John (1980). "Fl. Aetius 7". Prosopography of the Later Roman Empire. Vol. 2, AD 395–527. Cambridge: Cambridge University Press. pp. 21–29. ISBN 978-0-521-20159-9.

Political offices
Preceded by Anicius Auchenius Bassus; Antiochus Chuzon	Roman consul 432 with Valerius	Succeeded by Theodosius Augustus XIV; Petronius Maximus
Preceded by Anthemius Isidorus; Senator	Roman consul 437 with Sigisvultus	Succeeded by Theodosius Augustus XVI; Anicius Acilius Glabrio Faustus
Preceded by Valentinian Augustus VI; Nomus	Roman consul 446 with Q. Aurelius Symmachus	Succeeded by Calepius; Ardabur
Military offices
Preceded by Gaudentius	Magister militum per Gallias; 425–429	Succeeded by Avitus
Preceded by Sebastianus	Magister militum of the Western Roman army 433–454	Succeeded by Remistus; In 456
