= Battle of Mons Colubrarius =

The Battle of Mons Colubrarius was a battle in the Gothic War from 436 to 439. It was one of the many armed conflicts between the Gothic people and the Western Roman Empire during the first half of the fifth century. The main protagonists in the war were the Visigothic king Theodoric I and the commander-in-chief of the Western army General Aetius. The battle probably was fought near the French village Olonzac around 438.

== The Gothic War of 436-439 ==
In the Gothic war that erupted in 436, the Goths initially had a predominance, but were forced to lay down their arms as a result of the successful offensive of the Romans under the leadership of Litorius in 437. The opponents made peace that, however, was short-lived, because the following year the war broke out again in all intensity. Also this time the Goths were the instigators and lay domestic problems in Spain and piracy in the Mediterranean underlay this. The Romans made preparations for a new campaign and on this occasion Aetius personally took command.

== Sources ==
The Battle of Mons Colubrarius is known from only one source. The Roman poet Merobaudes refers to it in his Panegyric in honor of Emperor Valentinian III and his commander-in-chief Aetius:

«All the forces of the Goths... had set out with their king to destroy Roman territory... On the mountain that the Ancients call... Snake mountain [Mons Colubrarius]... he surprised as is his custom and killed most of the enemy; Once the infantry units, which were very numerous, had fled, he himself pursued the spreading cavalry troops and overwhelmed those who stood steadfast with his army, and those who fled with his eager speed. Shortly afterwards, the king appeared on stage with his remaining troops and was stunned to see all the trampled bodies... [here the text ends].« Merobaudes, Panegyric 1, fragment IIA, 10f

This hymn was pronounced in 438 by Merobaudes at the festive unveiling of a statue of the general commissioned by the emperor. According to historians like Ian Hughes, the battle to which the court poet refers in his poem must have taken place in the Gothic War of 436–439. Aetius was honored on that occasion for his victory over the Goths.

== The battle ==
From the hymn it can be said that Aetius did not achieve his victory after a conventional battle. There were no two armies facing each other here prior to the battle. Aetius surprised the Goths when their captain Theodoric was absent with part of his army.

Aetius achieved an important victory, because reportedly he slaughtered 8,000 Goths on the battlefield. Although the extent of the victory and the number of losses suffered by the Goths are undoubtedly exaggerated by Merobaudes – since this was a hymn – it seems that Theodorik had to take a major setback. However, the defeat was not final, as the Gothic king refused to capitulate and after that the war continued until 439.

== Location of the battle ==
It is not certain exactly where the battle took place. Nevertheless, there is a good theory where the Mons Colubrarius, which means Snake Mountain, is located. Near the French village of Olonzac, south of Gaul, lies a small hill called de Roc de la Garde Roland. From a 12th-century manuscript, it is told of a battle that took place here at the time of Charles the Great, about three centuries after the Gothic War of 436–439. A companion of Charlemagne, Bishop Turpin, questions a Saracen in the manuscript after the battle, who tells him that his house is at Petra Colobram, and that that hill would later be named Roc de la Garde Roland. In addition to the fact that the text thus seems to confirm this place as the location of the battle, the location lends itself well to a fight.

== Biography ==
- Hughes, I. (2020), Aetius: Attila's Nemesis, PEN & SWORD MILITARY
- Juan, F.O., La Batalla De Mons Colubrarius
