= Battle of Arles =

Battle of Arles or Siege of Arles may refer to:

- Battle of Arles (411), fought between the forces of Constantine III and Gerontius
- Siege of Arles (425), fought between the Visigoths and a Roman-Hunnic alliance
- Battle of Arles (435), fought between the Visigoths and the Western Roman Empire
- Battle of Arles (471), fought between the Visigoths and the Western Roman Empire
- Siege of Arles (507–508), fought between the Visigoths and the Franks
