= Battle of Toulouse =

Battle of Toulouse may refer to:

- Battle of Toulouse (439) between the Visigoths and the Western Roman Empire
- Battle of Toulouse (458) between the Visigoths and the Western Roman Empire
- Battle of Toulouse (721) between the Duchy of Aquitaine and the Umayyad Caliphate
- Battle of Toulouse (844) during the Carolingian civil war
- Battle of Toulouse (1814) during the Napoleonic Wars
