= Toulouse (disambiguation) =

Toulouse is one of the principal cities of France.

Toulouse may also refer to:

== Education ==
- University of Toulouse
- Toulouse Graduate School, University of North Texas, Denton

== Places ==
- The Arrondissement of Toulouse, containing the city of Toulouse
- Toulouse–Blagnac Airport
- Gare de Toulouse-Matabiau, a railway station

== History ==
- The Kingdom of Toulouse, a kingdom of Visigoths between the 5th and 8th centuries which had its capital at Toulouse

== Music ==
- Toulouse (EP), a 2014 EP by Benny Tipene
- "Toulouse" (song), a 2011 song by Nicky Romero
- "Toulouse Street" (album), a 1972 album and song by The Doobie Brothers

== People ==
- Henri de Toulouse-Lautrec (1864–1901), artist
- Stephen Toulouse (1972–2017), internet personality

== Sports ==
- Stade Toulousain, one of Europe's top rugby union clubs, often referred to as simply Toulouse
- Toulouse FC, the principal football club in Toulouse
- Toulouse Olympique, a rugby league club in Toulouse
- Toulouse FC (1937), a defunct football club

== Animals ==
- Toulouse goose, a breed of large, domesticated geese

== See also ==
- Battle of Toulouse (disambiguation)
