= Early Christian sarcophagi =

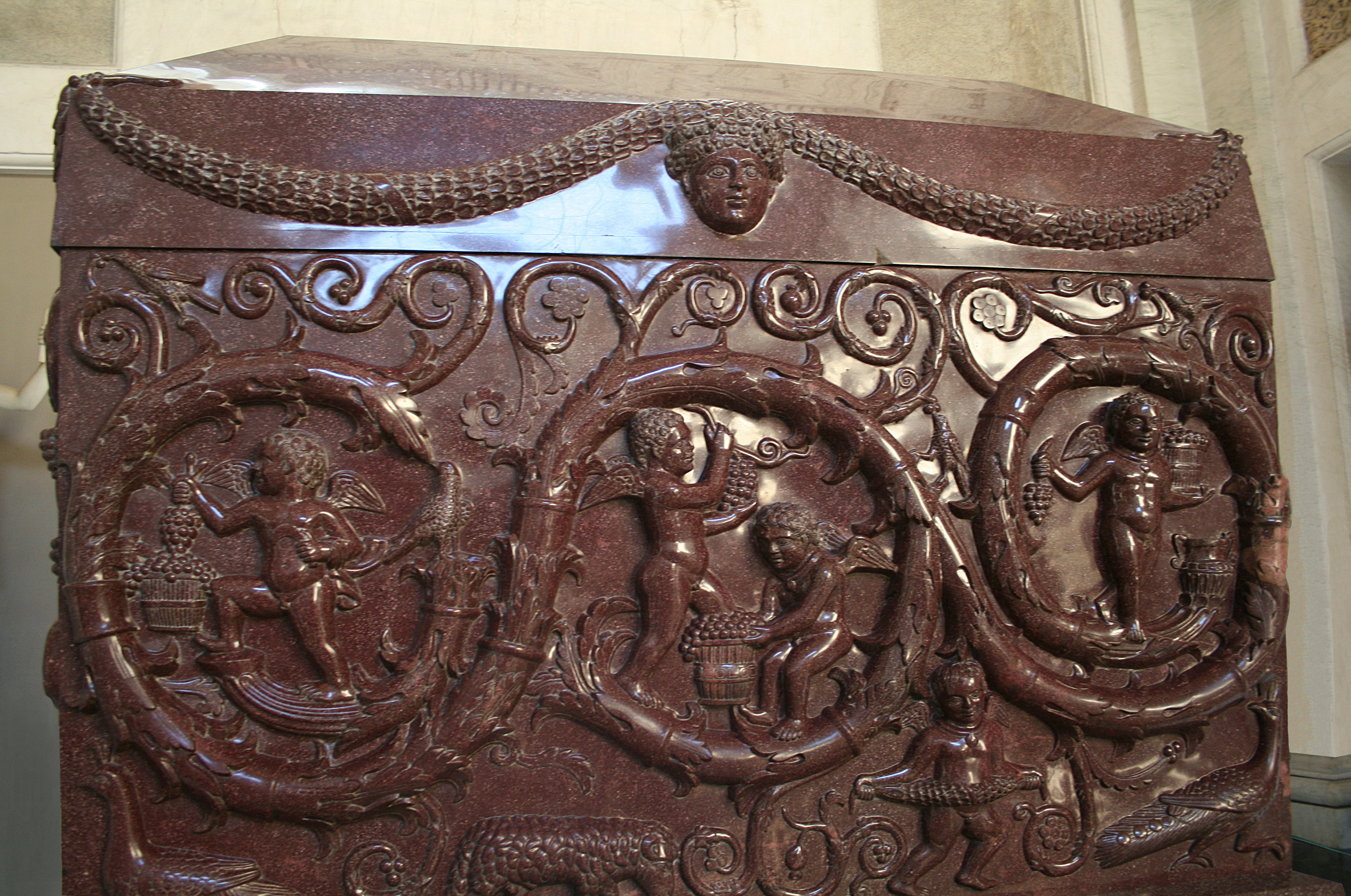
Sarcophagi of Helena and Constantina, daughter of Constantine I, from her mausoleum at Santa Costanza (now in Vatican Museums).

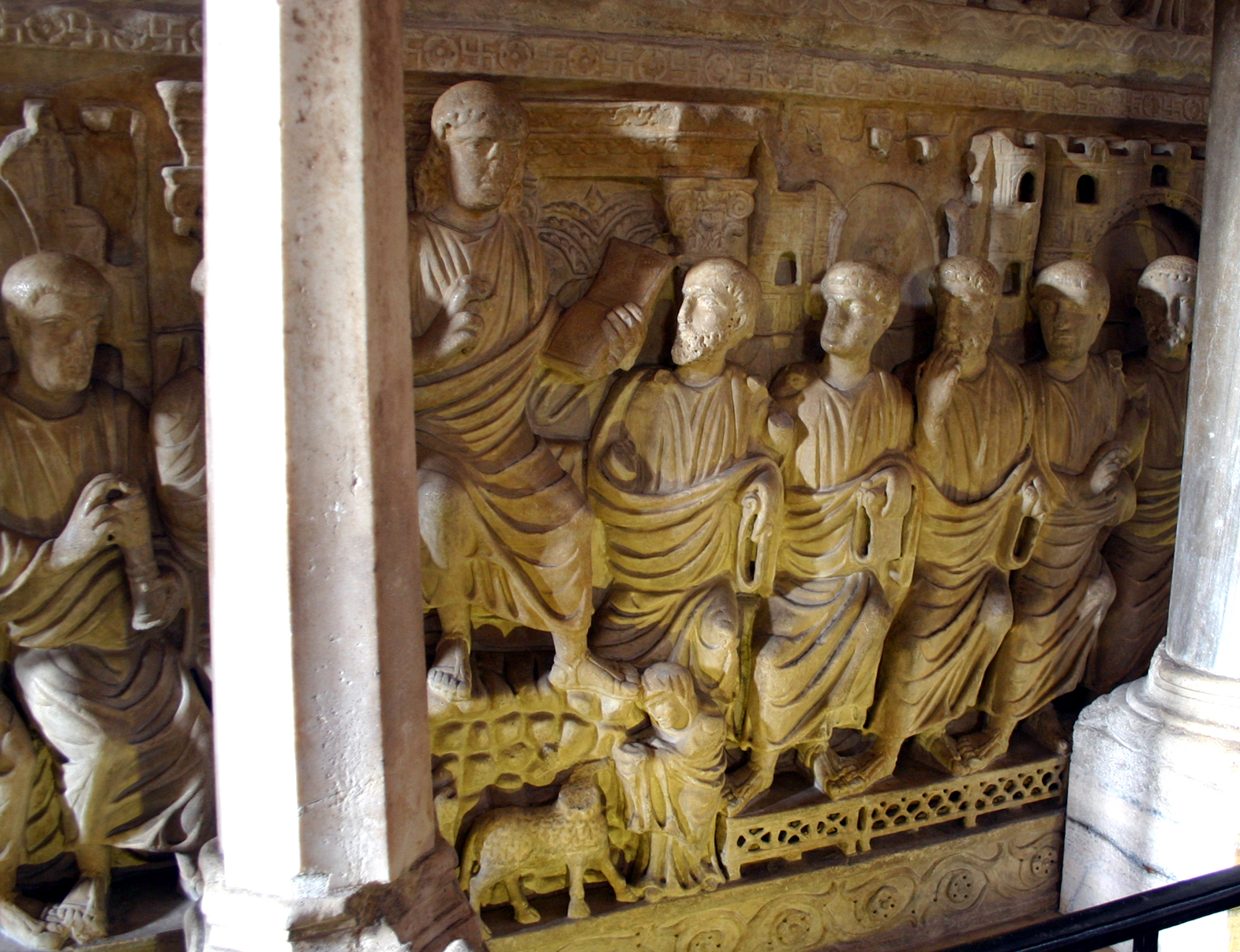
Detail of the central panel of the Sarcophagus of Stilicho, Basilica of Saint Ambrose, Milan

Early Christian sarcophagi are those Ancient Roman sarcophagi carrying inscriptions or carving relating them to early Christianity. They were produced from the late 3rd century through to the 5th century. They represent the earliest form of large Christian sculpture, and are important for the study of Early Christian art.

The production of Roman sarcophagi with carved decoration spread due to the gradual abandonment of the rite of cremation in favour of inhumation over the course of the 2nd century throughout the empire. However, burial in such sarcophagi was expensive and thus reserved for wealthy families. The end of the Christian persecutions desired by Gallienus in 260 began a period of peace for the Christians that lasted until the end of that century and allowed Christianity to spread in the army, in senior administrative posts and even the emperor's circles. In the second half of the 3rd century, especially due to increased demand from this group of wealthy Christians, the use of sarcophagi spread widely, with plastic treatments following trends in contemporary sculpture.

== Production and typology ==
The sarcophagi seem to have been produced by workshops who also created pieces with pagan or Jewish iconography. The techniques are the same, but Christian sarcophagi developed a rather different style of layout, with framed scenes, later arranged on two tiers. The images of Christ move in an iconic direction, very unlike the depiction of gods in pagan equivalents, where deities are normally shown, if at all, in narrative scenes.

== Iconography ==
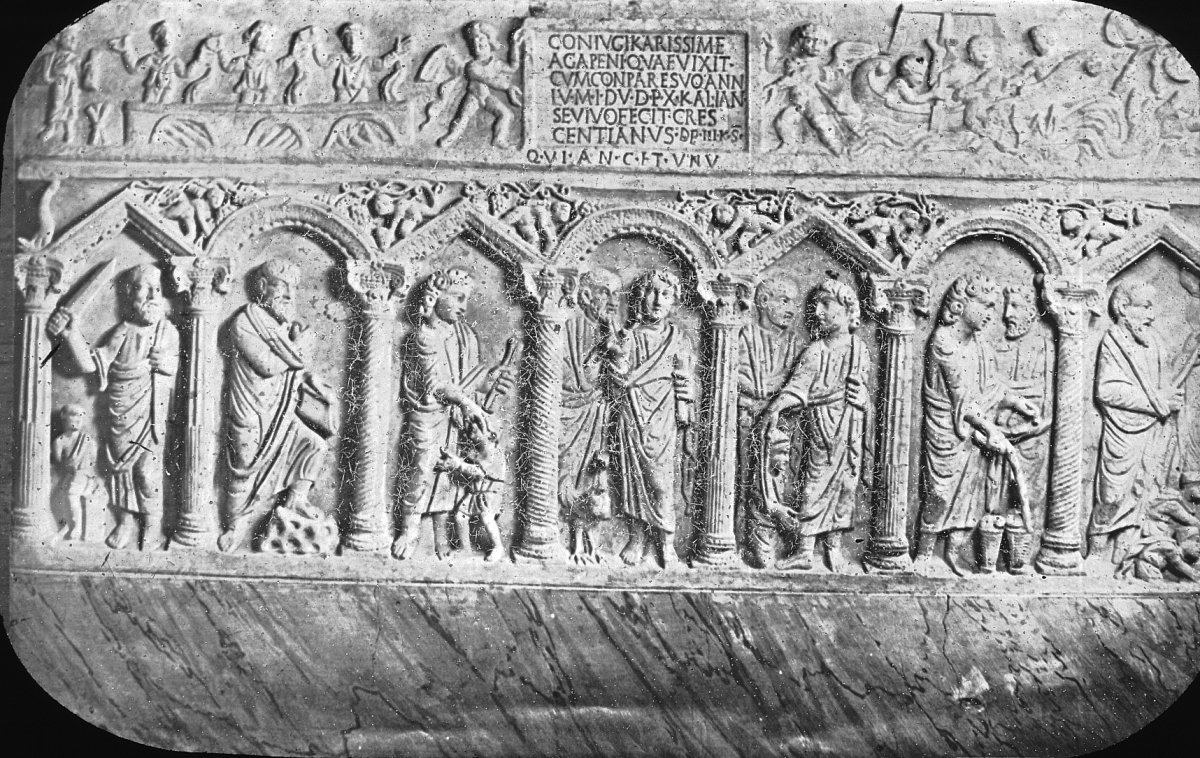
Lateran Museum, Rome, Italy. Rome - Early Christian sarcophagus, Lateran Museum, story of Isaac; Moses on Mount Sinai; healing blind; Peter denies Lord; healing sick; turning water into wine. Brooklyn Museum Archives, Goodyear Archival Collection

A wide variety of subjects are shown on sarcophagi, with the most elaborate containing small cycles of narrative scenes from the gospels and simpler ones symbols such as the Chi Rho. Other motifs depicted include the Hetoimasia, a representation of the empty throne with a book as preparation for the Last Judgment, the Traditio Legis or "giving of the law", with the scroll of the New Covenant given to St. Peter with St. Paul on the other side of Christ, and Christ in Majesty ("Maiestas domini")- representations of the majesty of the lord ranging from visions of prophets to Christ on a throne between the apostles with his feet on a footstool

== Notable examples ==
- Sarcophagi of Helena and Constantina
- Sarcophagos of Livia Primitiva (debated)
- Sarcophagus of Santa Maria Antiqua
- Sarcophagus of Stilicho
- Dogmatic Sarcophagus
- Sarcophagus of the "Two Brothers"
- Sarcophagus of the Good Shepherd
- Sarcophagus with the miracles of Christ
- Sarcophagus of Junius Bassus

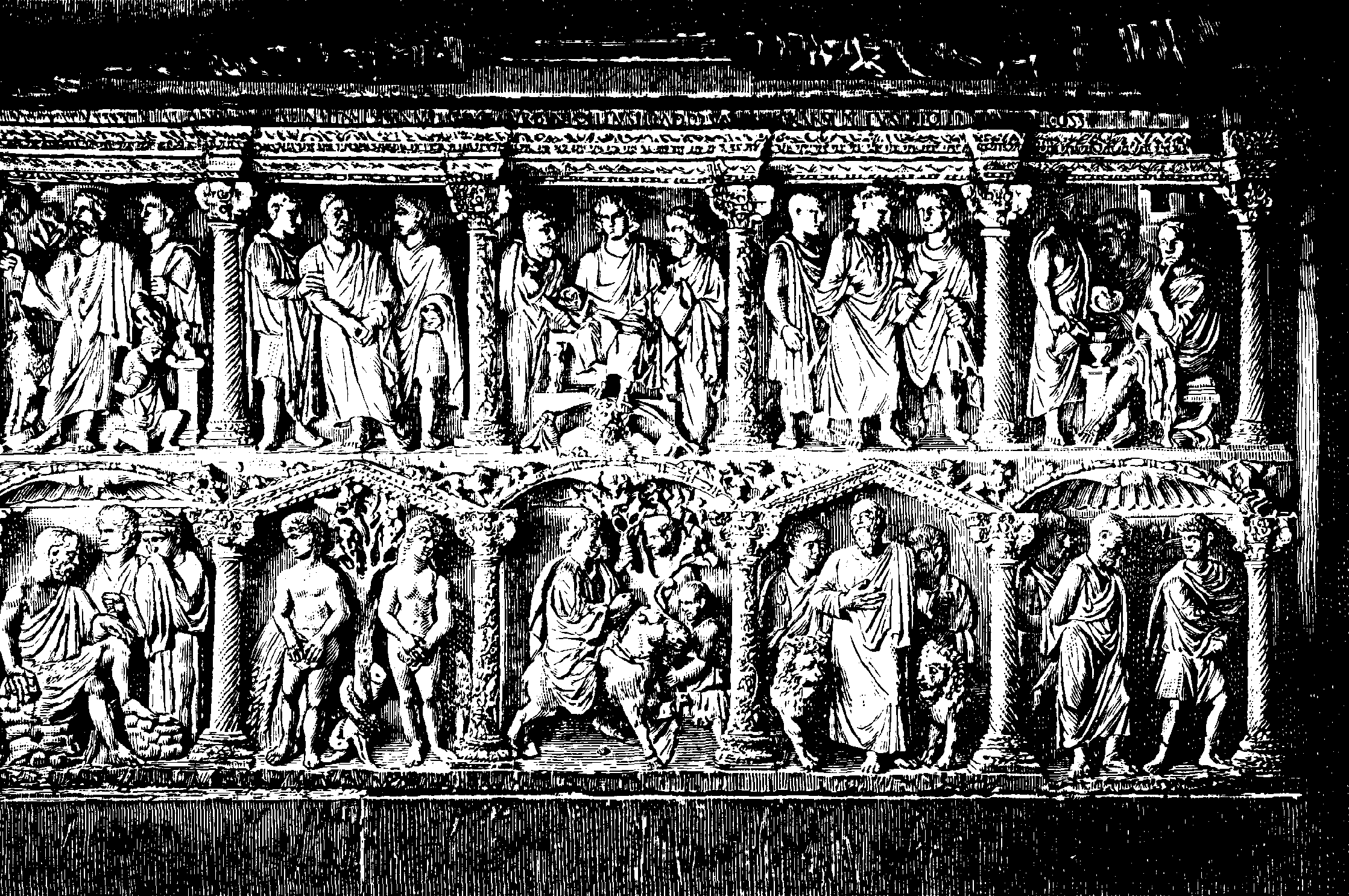
Engraving of the Sarcophagus of Junius Bassus.

- Sarcophagus of the Passion
- Sarcophagus of Adelphia

== Sources ==
- De Vecchi, Pierluigi; Elda Cerchiari (1999). I tempi dell'arte (in Italian). Milan: Bompiani.
