= Merobaudes =

Merobaudes is the name of two figures in ancient Rome:

- Merobaudes (magister peditum) (died 383 or 388 CE), Frankish general and Roman consul
- Merobaudes (poet) (5th Century CE), rhetorician and poet
