= Aetius, the Last Roman =

Aetius, the Last Roman (Polish: Aecjusz, ostatni Rzymianin) is a 1937 historical novel by Polish writer Teodor Parnicki. The novel is set in ancient Rome in the 5th century, the times of the fall of the Western Roman Empire, and depicts the Roman general Flavius Aetius who is trying to preserve the empire fighting against Visigoths and Huns. This novel brought Parnicki to recognition in Poland

The novel begins as a coming-of-age story, tracing the life of Aetius as a boy, a young man, and an adult. Most of the novel is about Aetius at the height of his power.

This novel earned Parnicki a grant from the Polish Academy of Literature, which allowed him to travel Greece, Constantinople and Italy.

The sequel, The Death of Aetius, was published in 1966.

As of 2014 it was translated into Russian, Estonian, Bulgarian, Hungarian, and German.
