= Battle of Toulouse (439) =

439 battle

Date	439
Location	Tolosa, Gallia Narbonensis I (modern Toulouse, France) 43.6045°N 1.444°E
Result	Visigothic victory

Belligerents
Visigoths	Western Roman Empire

Commanders and leaders
Theodoric I	Litorius †

Strength
Unknown	Unknown

Casualties and losses
Unknown	Unknown

The Battle of Toulouse was fought between the Visigoths and the Western Roman Empire in 439. Having previously defeated the Visigoths at Narbonne, the Roman general Litorius led his largely Hunnic army against Toulouse, the capital of the Visigothic Kingdom. During the siege, the Visigothic king Theodoric I attacked the Roman camp and inflicted heavy casualties. Litorius was captured and executed. Since the Visigoths also suffered heavy losses, Theodoric made peace with the Roman governor Avitus.

== See also ==
- Battle of Toulouse (458)

== Sources ==
- Jaques, Tony (2007). Dictionary of Battles and Sieges: P-Z. Greenwood Publishing Group. ISBN 978-0313335396.
