= Last of the Romans =

Person who holds values of ancient Romans

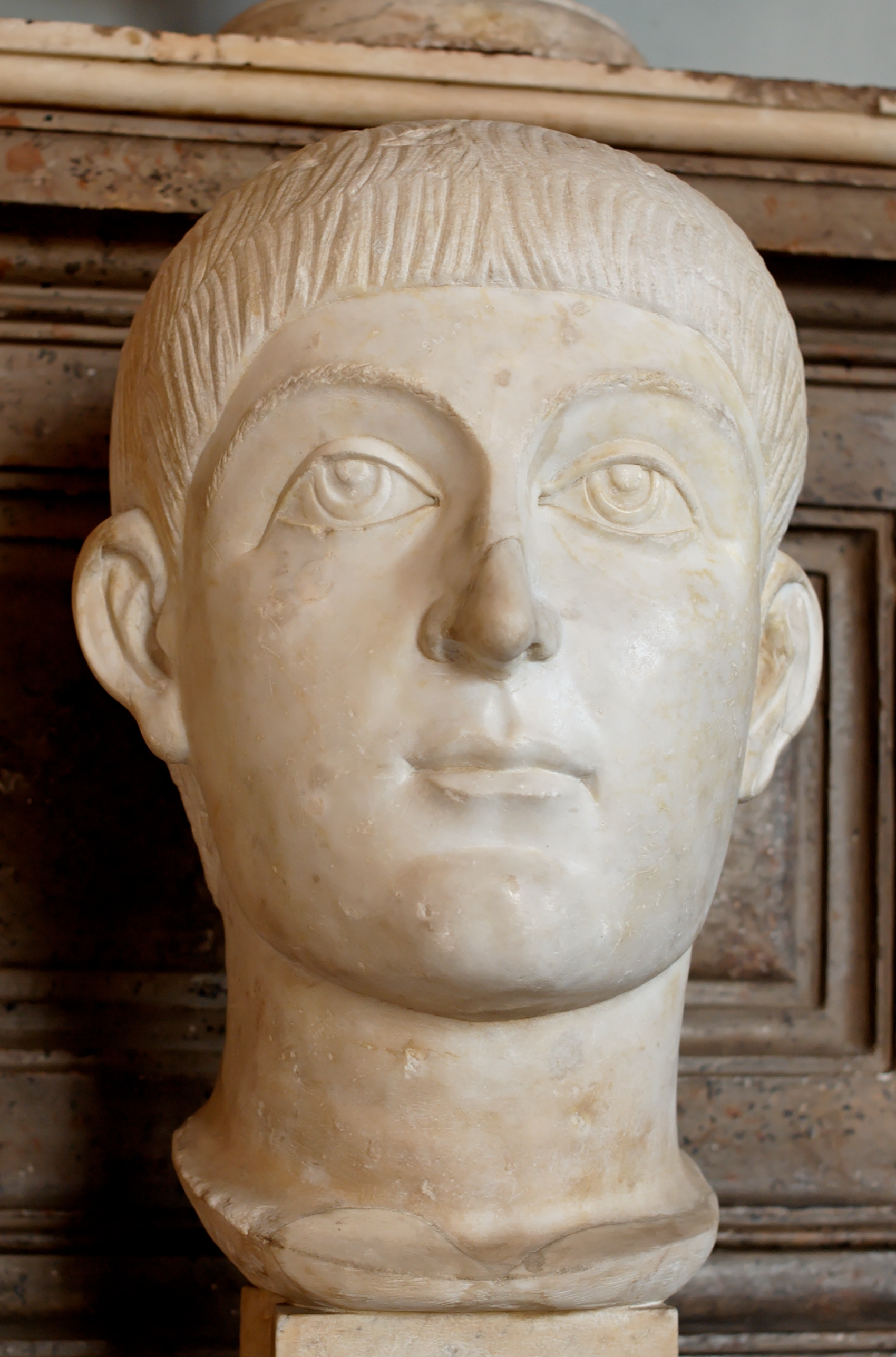
Valens, 66th Roman emperor

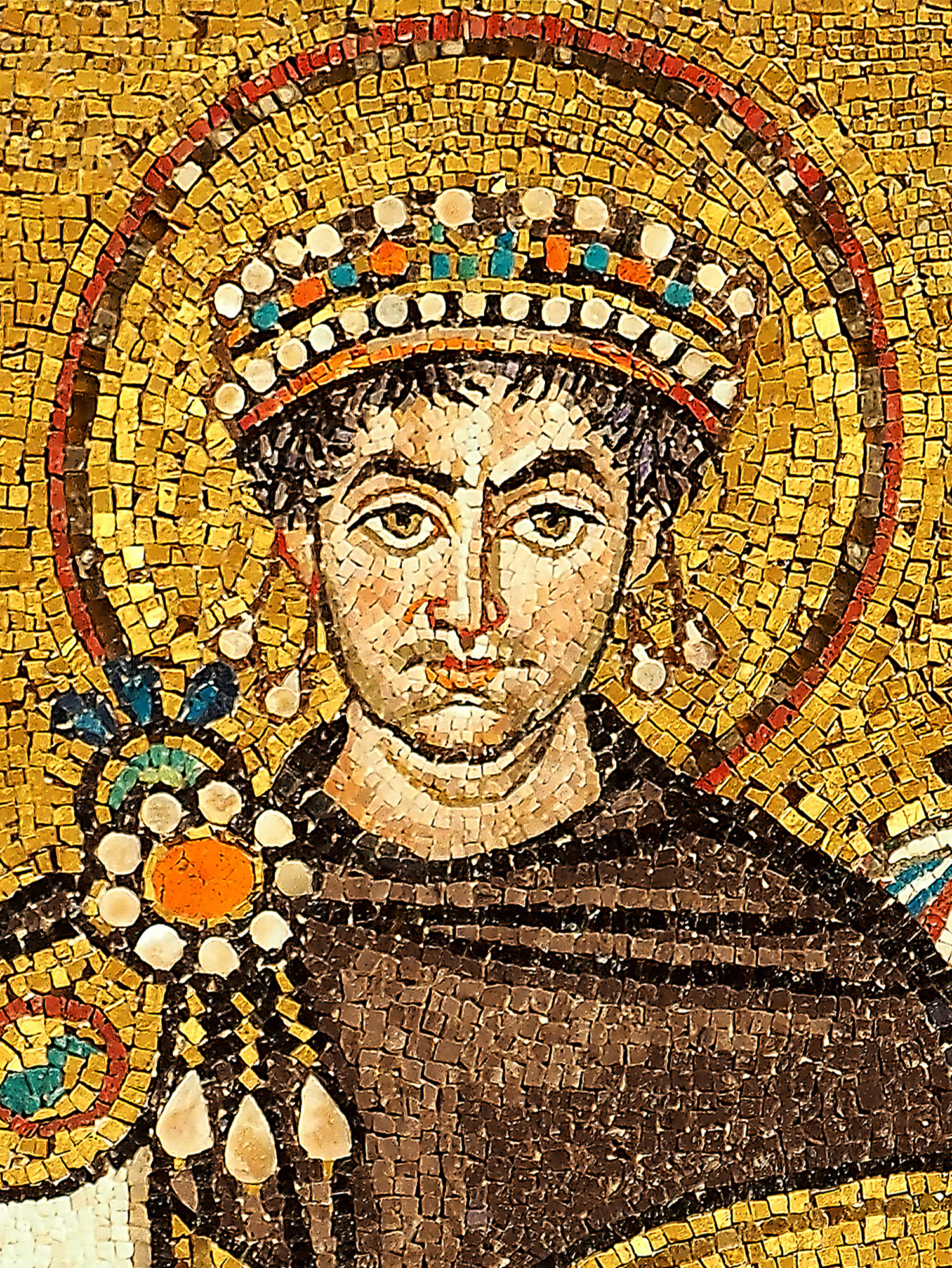
Justinian the Great, Byzantine Emperor

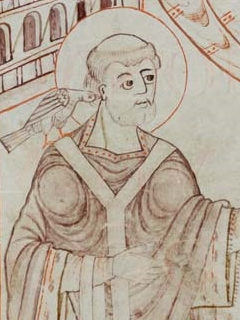
Pope Gregory I, saint and pope

The term Last of the Romans (Latin: Ultimus Romanorum or variations thereof) has historically been used to describe a person thought to embody the values of ancient Roman civilization – values which, by implication, became extinct on their death. It has been used to describe a number of individuals. The first recorded instance was Julius Caesar's description of Marcus Junius Brutus as the one with whom the old Roman spirit would become extinct.

== List of people described as the "Last of the Romans" ==
=== In ancient and early medieval Mediterranean ===
- Gaius Cassius Longinus (d. 42 BC), so called by Brutus and by the ancient historian Aulus Cremutius Cordus.
- Gaius Asinius Pollio (75 BC – AD 4), one of the last great orators and writers of the Roman Republic.
- Valentinian I (321–375), the last Western Emperor to campaign extensively on both sides of the Rhine and Danube frontiers.
- Valens (328–378), "the Last True Roman" Eastern Emperor (and brother of Valentinian I) who led his army to a catastrophic defeat in the Battle of Adrianople.
- Stilicho, a powerful Vandalic-Roman general in the early 5th century. Also called "the last of the Roman generals" in Chapter XXX of Edward Gibbon's The History of the Decline and Fall of the Roman Empire.
- Flavius Aëtius (396?–454), a general in the late Western Roman Empire who defended Gaul against the Franks and other barbarians, and defeated Attila in the Catalaunian Fields near Châlons, in 451. So called by Procopius.
- Count Boniface (died 432), a general in the late Western Roman Empire. Rival of Flavius Aëtius. So called by Procopius.
- Galla Placidia (388-450), empress consort to Constantius III and mother of Valentinian III, she was "the last Roman empress" and de facto ruler of the Western Roman Empire from 425 to 437.
- Majorian (420–461), Roman Emperor between 457 and 461. He was the last emperor universally recognized as the de facto ruler of the entire western empire, briefly reconquering most of the lost territories in Gaul and Hispania.
- Ambrosius Aurelianus (5th century), a Romano-British military commander against the Anglo-Saxon invasion. So called by Gildas.
- Romulus Augustulus (deposed 476), the last reigning Western Roman Emperor.
- Julius Nepos (died 480), the predecessor to Romulus Augustulus and the last legitimate Western Roman Emperor. He ruled a rump state in Dalmatia for another four years until his death in 480.
- Syagrius (c. 430-486), a Roman general who held control of Roman territory in northern Gaul, today called the Kingdom of Soissons, for another decade after the fall of Romulus Augustulus.
- Anicius Manlius Severinus Boethius (480–525?), one of the last great philosophers of Rome. He was regarded as last of the Romans and first of the medieval scholastics by Martin Grabmann; also a canonized saint.
- Gildas (fl. early 6th century), Romano-British clergyman, writer and saint.
- Justinian I "the Great" (482?–565), second of the Justinian Dynasty, and probably the last Byzantine emperor to speak Latin as his mother tongue.
- Flavius Belisarius (505?–565), a widely acclaimed general of the Byzantine Empire under Justinian, known for his reconquest of portions of the Western Empire.
- Flavius Magnus Aurelius Cassiodorus Senator (c. 485 – c. 580), Roman statesman and writer.
- Gregory the Great (540?–604), an influential Pope and native to Rome.
- Desiderius of Cahors (580?–655), Gallo-Roman aristocrat, bishop, and saint.

=== In England ===
- William Congreve, called "Ultimus Romanorum" by Alexander Pope.
- Samuel Johnson, called "Ultimus Romanorum" by Thomas Carlyle.
- H. H. Asquith, "last of the Romans" was used on numerous occasions for him after his fall from power in 1916.

=== In the United States ===
In the United States, "last of the Romans" was used on numerous occasions during the early 19th century as an epithet for the political leaders and statesmen who participated in the American Revolution by signing the United States Declaration of Independence, taking part in the American Revolutionary War, or established the United States Constitution.

- Nathaniel Macon, called “Ultimus Romanorum” by Thomas Jefferson.

== See also ==
- Fall of the Western Roman Empire
- Succession of the Roman Empire
- Fall of Constantinople
- Succession to the Byzantine Empire
- Legacy of the Roman Empire
