= Nomus =

East Roman state official

Nomus (fl. 443–450 AD) was a politician and an ambassador of the Eastern Roman Empire.

== Biography ==
Nomus was magister officiorum from 443 to 446, and served as consul in 445, with Western Emperor Valentinian III as colleague.

On 12 December 443, Nomus was ordered to strengthen the defence of the Danube limes, recently affected by the attacks of the Huns of Attila: the forts were rebuilt and the frontier garrisons restored to their nominal strength. The work, which had to last for the whole year 444, was such that Nomus was appointed consul for the following year by way of reward. However, when Attila resumed his raids in 447, he did so through the provinces of Scythia Minor and Moesia Inferior, skirting around the fortifications built by Nomus to the east.

In 448 Nomus was raised to the rank of patricius.

The attack of 447 ended in a peace in 448, but in 450 Attila was again at war against the Roman Empire. In response to an offer of negotiations, he said he would deal only with ambassadors of consular rank, and mentioned the names of Nomus, Senator and Anatolius. Nomus (chosen as loyal supporter of the powerful eunuch Chrysaphius) and his companion went to meet Attila, who treated them badly at the beginning, but later succumbed to their oratorical arts and to the gifts they had brought: Attila would accept the terms of peace of 448, he would stop attacking the Emperor Theodosius II, and give up the strip of land south of the Danube obtained with the peace of 448; it seems that the granting of the release of many Roman prisoners was a concession made personally to the two prestigious guests.

In 449, the monk Eutyches asked Emperor Theodosius to summon the Council of Chalcedon: Chrysaphius and Nomus joined him and obtained the proclamation. He then participated in several sessions of the Council, in 451.

He is said to have spent a lot of money to fuel his ambitions. During his tenure as magister officiorum, he was contacted by two nephews of the bishop Cyril of Alexandria; he helped them by lending some money, but he required very high rates of interest. He was the addressee of some letters by Theodoret, as he was very influential with the Emperor.

== Bibliography ==
- Thompson, Edward Arthur, The Huns, Blackwell Publishing, 1996, ISBN 0-631-21443-7, pp. 96–99, 134–135.
- Martindale, John R., ed. (1980). "Nomus 1". The Prosopography of the Later Roman Empire: Volume II, AD 395–527. Cambridge: Cambridge University Press. pp. 785–786. ISBN 0-521-20159-4.

Preceded by Theodosius Augustus XVIII; Caecina Decius Aginatius Albinus	Roman consul 445 with Valentinian Augustus VI	Succeeded by Aetius III; Q. Aurelius Symmachus
