= Battle of Arles (435) =

Date	435
Location	Arelate, Gallia Viennensis II (now Arles, France) 43.677°N 4.628°E
Result	Roman-Hunnic victory

Belligerents
Visigoths	Western Roman Empire; Huns

Commanders and leaders
Theodoric I	Flavius Aetius; Attila

Strength
Unknown	Unknown

Casualties and losses
Unknown	Unknown

The Battle of Arles was fought between the Visigoths and the Western Roman Empire in 435. The Visigoths and the Romans had previously been in peace after having fought each other at Arles in 425, but in 435 the Visigothic king Theodoric I again broke the peace treaty and invaded Gaul, laying siege to Arles once more. He was however defeated and driven away by the Romans under the leadership of Flavius Aetius and his largely Hunnic army. Two years later, Theodoric was defeated at a decisive battle at Narbonne.

== Sources ==
- Jaques, Tony (2007). Dictionary of Battles and Sieges: A-E. Greenwood Publishing Group. ISBN 978-0313335372.
