= Anatolius (consul) =

5th century Eastern Roman Empire consul, diplomat and general

Anatolius (Greek: Ανατόλιος, fl. 421 – 451) was a diplomat and general of the Eastern Roman Empire and Consul in 440. He was very influential during the reign of Theodosius II, and held command of the Empire's eastern armies for 13 years. He led negotiations with Attila the Hun on several occasions.

== Biography ==
In 421 AD, Anatolius led one Roman army in Persian Armenia during the war against the Sassanids.

Anatolius was magister militum per Orientem from 433 to 446 AD, reaching the consulate in 440 AD, which he held with the Western Emperor Valentinian III as a colleague.

== Accomplishments ==
In his capacity as magister militum, he built the fortress of Theodosiopolis along the border with Persarmenia in the mid-430s. In 440, he directed some works at Heliopolis of Phoenicia and rebuilt the walls of Gerasa in Arabia. In 440, the Sassanid king Yazdegerd II attacked the Romans. Theodosius II sent Anatolius to parley with the Great King. Anatolius reached the Sassanid army, dismounted and advanced on foot. Yazdegerd, informed that he was the Roman general, was baffled by such a demonstration of respect and retired to his camp with the whole army. He received the envoy of Theodosius, treating him with honor and accepted peace.

In 442 Anatolius had donated a silver reliquary for the bones of Thomas the Apostle to the church of Edessa. He built a church at Antioch which took the name of the "Basilica of Anatolius". He received several letters from Theodoret, with requests for help.

In 443, Anatolius managed to conclude a truce for one year with Attila the Hun. In 446, he ended his service as magister militum per Orientem; the following year, he is already attested as patricius. In 448 Anatolius concluded a peace agreement with Attila, agreeing to pay an annual tribute of 2,100 pounds of gold. In 450, however, Attila was again at war against the Roman Empire, on the pretext that the Emperor was harbouring fugitives from the Hunnic realm. To an offer of parley, Attila replied that he would deal only with ambassadors of consular rank, and mentioned the names of Nomus, Senator and Anatolius. Anatolius, who by then had become magister militum praesentalis (a position he held until at least the next year), and his friend went to meet Attila, who treated them badly at the beginning, but later succumbed to their oratorical arts and the gifts they had brought: Attila would accept the terms of the peace of 448, he would stop attacking the Emperor Theodosius II and give up the strip of land south of the Danube obtained with the peace of 448; it seems that the granting of the release of many prisoners to the Romans was a concession made personally to the two prestigious guests.

In 451 Anatolius participated in various sessions of the Council of Chalcedon as dean of the imperial representatives.

At the beginning of the reign of Marcian, Florentius and Anatolius dissuaded the Emperor from supporting the uprising of the Armenians against the Sassanid Empire.

== Bibliography ==
- Croke, Brian, Count Marcellinus and His Chronicle, Oxford University Press, 2001, ISBN 0-19-815001-6, p. 58.
- Martindale, John R., ed. (1980). "Anatolius 10". The Prosopography of the Later Roman Empire: Volume II, AD 395–527. Cambridge: Cambridge University Press. pp. 84–86. ISBN 0-521-20159-4.
- Thompson, Edward Arthur, The Huns, Blackwell Publishing, 1996, ISBN 0-631-21443-7, pp. 96–99, 134–135.
- Whitby, Michael, The Ecclesiastical History of Evagrius Scholasticus, Liverpool University Press, 2001, ISBN 0-85323-605-4, pp. 45–66.

Preceded by Imp. Caesar Flavius Theodosius Augustus XVII, Fl. Festus	Consul of the Roman Empire; 440 with Imp. Caesar Placidus Valentinianus Augustus V	Succeeded by Fl. Taurus Seleucus Cyrus
