= Senator (consul 436) =

Flavius Senator (floruit 436–449) was a politician of the Eastern Roman Empire.

== Biography ==
Senator was appointed consul posterior in the year 436 AD, with Anthemius Isidorus as consul prior. According to Priscus, he was sent by Eastern Roman Emperor Theodosius II as an envoy to the King of the Huns, Attila in 442/443. In 449, Attila stated that he would accept as envoy only Senator, Anatolius and Nomus, all of consular rank.

He received the title patricius before 445–447. He was a recipient of Theodoret's letter requesting tax reduction on his city in 445–447. In 451, he was present during some sessions of the Council of Chalcedon, which is his last action to be reliably recorded in the sources.

He founded Church of Archangel Michael in Constantinople, which may have been small in scale. The building was torn down in the 6th century for Justinian I to rebuild it.

== Bibliography ==
- Martindale, John R., ed. (1980). The Prosopography of the Later Roman Empire: Volume II, AD 395–527. Cambridge: Cambridge University Press. ISBN 0-521-20159-4.

| Preceded by Imp. Caesar Flavius Theodosius Augustus XV, Imp. Caesar Flavius Placidus Valentinianus Augustus IV | Consul of the Roman Empire; 436 with Fl. Anthemius Isidorus | Succeeded by Fl. Aetius II, Flavius Sigisvultus |
