= Sigisvultus =

Flavius Sigisvultus (fl. 427–448) was a general of the late Western Roman Empire.

He was sent in 427 to command the war in Africa against a rebellious general, Bonifacius. Previous generals had been defeated by the latter. Sigisvultus may have been appointed comes Africae, succeeding Bonifacius. He seized Hippo and Carthage, and as an Arian himself, sent an Arian bishop, Maximinus, to dispute with Augustine of Hippo in 427 or 428. He presumably returned to Italy after relations between the Emperor and Bonifacius were restored in 429 or 430.

He served as consul in 437 with Flavius Aetius. From either the same year or from 440 until 448, he was magister utriusque militiae (though despite the title he remained under the command of Aetius), and organized defences against the Vandals. By 448 he had become a patrician.

The name Sigisvultus is of German origin, and is also written Sigisvult, Segisvultus, or Sigisvuldus. He is also sometimes called Sigisvult the Goth.

Preceded by Anthemius Isidorus, Fl. Senator	Consul of the Roman Empire; 437 with Fl. Aetius	Succeeded by Fl. Theodosius Augustus, Anicius Acilius Glabrio Faustus
