= Gaudentius (magister equitum) =

Roman army officer

Gaudentius (died before AD 425) was the father of the Roman magister militum Flavius Aetius and married to an Italian noblewoman. He is described as a native of the Roman province Scythia (although some misread this to portray him as an ethnic Scythian).

Gaudentius served under the Eastern Roman emperor Theodosius I against the usurper Eugenius. Later, when his son Flavius Aetius was born in 396, Gaudentius served as magister equitum, or Master of Cavalry, under the Emperor Honorius. In 399, he served as the comes Africae. Augustine of Hippo claimed that he destroyed pagan temples in Carthage. Gaudentius, along with Jovius, are described by Gibbon as destroying Pagan temples under orders from Theodosius I. During the usurpation of Joannes, Gaudentius was made magister militum praesentalis. Gaudentius died in a military uprising in Gaul before 425.
