= Battle of Narbonne (436) =

436 battle between Rome and the Visigoths

- Part of the Gothic War of 436–439; Fall of the Roman Empire and Roman–Germanic Wars
Date	436–437 AD
Location	Narbonne, Gaul, Western Roman Empire 43°11′05″N 3°00′13″E
Result	Roman victory

Belligerents
Western Roman Empire; Huns	Visigoths

Commanders and leaders
Litorius; Flavius Aetius	Theodoric I

Strength
Unknown	Unknown

Casualties and losses
Unknown	Unknown
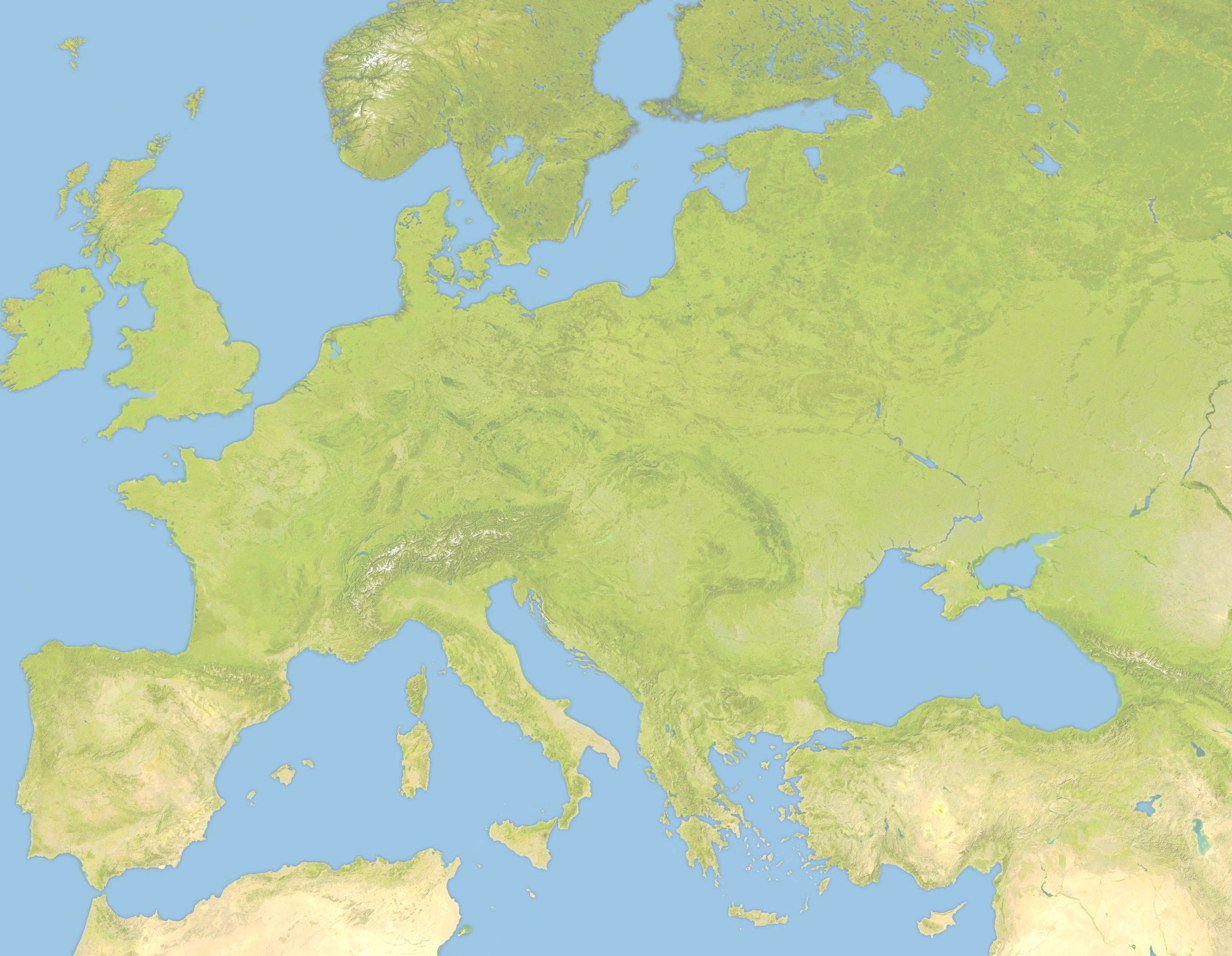
- Location within France Battle of Narbonne (436) (Europe without the extreme north)

The siege of Narbonne was a conflict between the Visigothic Foederati of Aquitania and the Western Roman Empire.

== History ==
The siege began in late 436 and carried over into 437, when the Roman Magister Militum Litorius arrived with a force of Huns and the Gallic Field Army. Litorius surprised the Visigoths and routed their army before they could draw up a coherent battle line. Prosper of Aquitaine records that to alleviate the starvation of the city, each soldier in Litorius' army was ordered to carry two measures of wheat for the citizens of Narbonne.
