= Litorius =

Roman general (died 439)

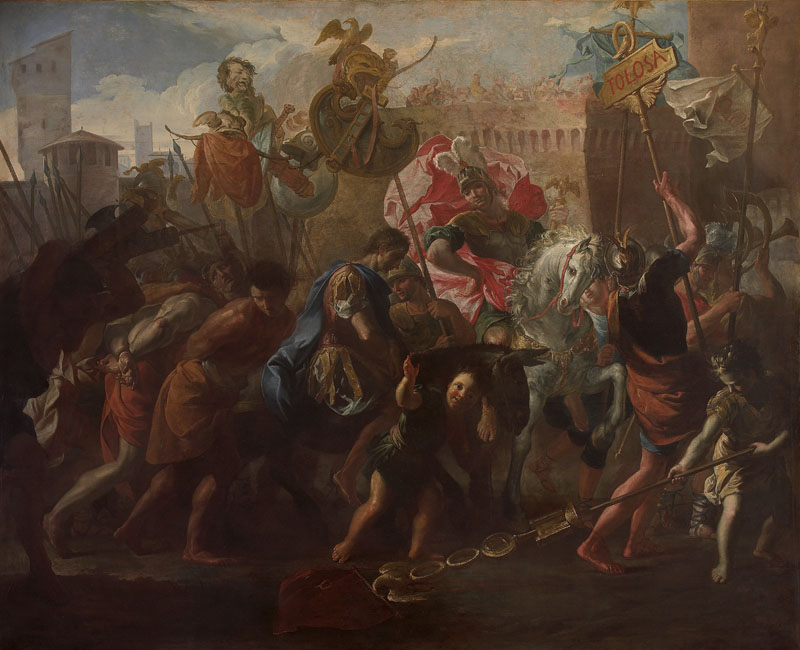
Rivalz Theodoric I Litorius (RO 225)

Litorius (died 439) was a Roman general of the closing period of the Western Roman Empire serving as Magister militum per Gallias mainly in Gaul under magister militum Flavius Aetius (from 435 until his death). Litorius is noted for being the last Roman commander in the ancient Roman military history to perform pagan rites and the consultation of auspices before a battle.

His military actions were mostly focused against Visigoths who had gradually been attempting to spread their control over Gaul. In 436 their king Theodoric I tried to conquer Narbo Martius to obtain access to the Mediterranean Sea and the roads to the Pyrenees. At the Battle of Narbonne Litorius, with the aid of the Huns, prevented the capture of the city and drove the Visigoths back to their capital Tolosa. But in the consequent battle at Tolosa in 439 the allied forces of Romans and Huns were defeated by the Visigoths and Litorius soon died during imprisonment from injuries which he had received in this battle.

== See also ==
- Second Bagaudae Revolt
- Gothic War (436-439)
