= Teodor Parnicki =

Polish writer (1908–1988)

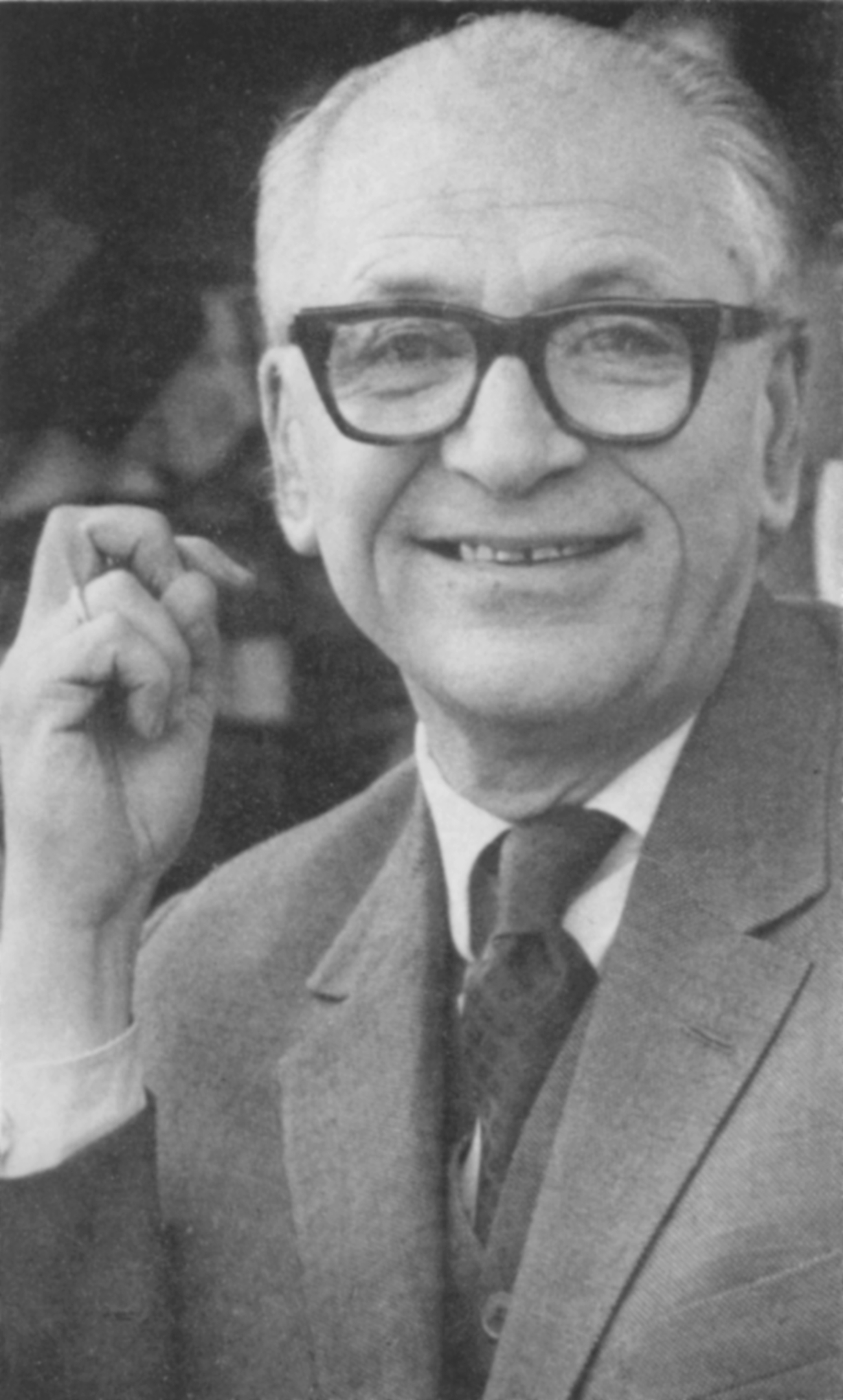
Teodor Parnicki

Teodor Parnicki (1908–1988) was a Polish writer, notable for his historical novels. He is especially renowned for works related to the early medieval Middle East, the late Roman and the Byzantine Empires.

== Life ==
Teodor Parnicki was born March 5, 1908, to a Polish father and a Polish Jewish mother, in Berlin, where his father, Bronisław Parnicki, had been studying at the Technische Hochschule in Charlottenburg (now Technische Universität Berlin). Upon receiving a doctorate, the family moved to Moscow, where Parnicki's father worked for various Russian companies. After the outbreak of World War I, the Parnicki family - officially citizens of Germany - had to abandon Moscow and move to Ufa, where Parnicki's mother died soon afterwards. Bronisław Parnicki then married a Russian woman who sent young Teodor to a cadet corps school in Omsk and then Vladivostok. Tired of the military drill, at the age of 12 Parnicki escaped from the cadet school and reached Harbin in Manchuria, where he was taken care of by the local Polonia community. He was sent to a local Polish school, where he had to learn his mother tongue almost from the beginning, having been brought up in German and Russian towns. His father joined him in Manchuria, but died soon afterwards. Upon graduating from the school and passing his matura, Parnicki moved to Poland and settled in Lwów, where he joined the Lwów University.

There he studied Polish literature under the tutelage of Prof. Juliusz Kleiner, one of the most renowned specialists in the works of Juliusz Słowacki. Parnicki quickly started his university career as both a student and a tutor and eventually lectured on Chinese language and Russian literature.

His first novel, Trzy minuty po trzeciej, was published in 1931. However, it was his fourth work (Æcjusz, ostatni Rzymianin - Ætius, the last of the Romans) that made him popular in Poland. Thanks to a scholarship he received for that novel in 1936, Parnicki spent several years in Bulgaria, Turkey and Greece, where he devoted himself to studies on the Byzantine heritage of those states. He returned to Poland shortly before the outbreak of World War II.

After the Polish Defensive War, during the Soviet occupation of Lwów, Parnicki was arrested by the NKVD and sentenced to 8 years in a gulag for alleged anti-Soviet conspiracy. Set free after the Sikorski-Mayski Agreement of 1941, he joined the Polish Army of Władysław Anders and was delegated to the Polish embassy in Kuybyshev as its cultural attache. After the evacuation of the Polish Army from Soviet Russia he spent some time in Tehran and then settled in Jerusalem. In 1944 he moved to Mexico City, where he assumed the same post he had earlier in Kuybyshev. However, the following year Mexico withdrew its recognition of the Polish Government in Exile and Parnicki was left without a job. He remained in Mexico and made his living publishing some of his works in small issues for the Polish exiles and received a small pension from the local Polonia. In 1967 he returned to Poland and settled in Warsaw. He died December 5, 1988, shortly before finishing his opus magnum, a four-volume novel. It was published in 2003 under the title of Ostatnia powieść - the last novel.

== Works ==
- Trzy minuty po trzeciej ( 1929, Lwów)
- Hrabia Julian i król Roderyk (1934, Lwów)
- Opowiadania (1934–1939, Lwów)
- Aecjusz, ostatni Rzymianin (1936, Lwów)
- Szkice literackie (1933–1939, Lwów)
- Srebrne orły (1944, Jerusalem)
- Koniec „Zgody Narodów” (1955, Mexico)
- Słowo i ciało (1959, Mexico)
- Twarz księżyca – Tom 1 (1961, Mexico)
- Nowa baśń 1 – Robotnicy wezwani o jedenastej (1961, Mexico)
- Twarz księżyca Tom 2 (1961, Mexico)
- Nowa baśń 2 – Czas siania i czas zbierania (1962, Mexico)
- Tylko Beatrycze (1962, Mexico)
- Nowa baśń 3 – Labirynt (1963, Mexico)
- I u możnych dziwny (1964, Mexico)
- Nowa baśń 4 – Gliniane dzbany (1965, Mexico)
- Koła na piasku (1965, Mexico)
- Śmierć Aecjusza (1966, Mexico)
- Nowa baśń 5 – Wylęgarnie dziwów (1967, Mexico)
- Twarz księżyca Tom 3 (1967, Warszawa)
- Zabij Kleopatrę (1968, Warszawa)
- Inne życie Kleopatry (1968, Warszawa)
- Nowa baśń 6 – Palec zagrożenia (1970, Warszawa)
- Tożsamość (1970, Warszawa)
- Muza dalekich podróży (1970, Warszawa)
- Staliśmy jak dwa sny (1972, Warszawa)
- Rodowód literacki (1973, Warszawa)
- Historia w literaturę przekuwana (1973, Warszawa)
- Przeobrażenie (1973, Warszawa)
- Sam wyjdę bezbronny (1975, Warszawa)
- Sekret trzeciego Izajasza (1980, Warszawa)
- Dary z Kordoby (1981, Warszawa)
- Rozdwojony w sobie (1981, Warszawa)
- Kordoba z darów (1986, Warszawa)
- Opowieść o trzech Metysach (postmortem 1994, Warszawa)
- Ostatnia powieść (postmortem 2003, Warszawa)
- Dzienniki z lat osiemdziesiątych (postmortem 2008, Kraków)
