= Anicius Acilius Glabrio Faustus =

Roman politician and aristocrat

Anicius Acilius Glabrio Faustus (fl. 425–443) was an aristocrat of the later Roman Empire. He was Urban prefect three times before 437, consul in 438, and briefly Praetorian prefect of Italy in 442. Faustus was selected to promulgate the Theodosian Code in the Western Empire.

Faustus was the son of Acilius Glabrio Sibidius, who is known from a dedication to him from Faustus. Sibidius was a member of the lineage of the Acilii Glabriones, who descended from the consul of 191 BC, Manius Acilius Glabrio. Cameron states his mother was one of the house of the gens Anicia, although unable to identify the woman. His descendants include Rufius Achilius Maecius Placidus (cos. 481), Anicius Acilius Aginantius Faustus (cos. 483), and Rufius Achilius Sividius (cos. 488).

Political offices
| Preceded by Aetius; Sigisvultus | Roman consul 438 with Theodosius | Succeeded by Theodosius; Festus |
