= Sarcophagus of Livia Primitiva =

Ancient Roman stone coffin

The Sarcophagus of Livia Primitiva is an Ancient Roman stone coffin with ornamental engraved with a Latin text and figures of the Good Shepherd, a fish, and an anchor and was originally housed in the Louvre. Initially thought to be an ancient Christian sarcophagus, but now it is thought to be pagan.

== Description ==
The Sarcophagus was originally discovered in the Ostrianum and Vatican Cemetery. The good shepherd is seen with one sheep on each of his sides. There has been speculation on the religious origins of the Sarcophagus of Livia Primitiva. It was thought to be Christian because the artwork was tied to Christianity, but later evidence strongly suggests that this artifact was built for a Pagan entombment.

Livia Primitiva was 24 years and 9 months of age at the time of her death. Raoul Rochette suggest that Livia Primitiva's monument was actually Pagan and had Christian elements added later.

Victor Schultze agreed with Raoul-Rochette's theory. Schultze argues that in Christian monuments, the shepherd either carries the sheep with both hands, or he carries the sheep by the legs with one hand, or the sheep lies on the shepherds shoulder without being held for any support. The shepherd on the sarcophagus of Livia Primitiva the sheep is seen on the shepherds shoulder while the shepherd is holding the sheep providing it support and therefor the inscription on the monument proves to not be Christian. The style in which the shepherd is carrying the sheep indicates that Livia Primitiva's sarcophagus was suspected to be that of a Pagan faith.

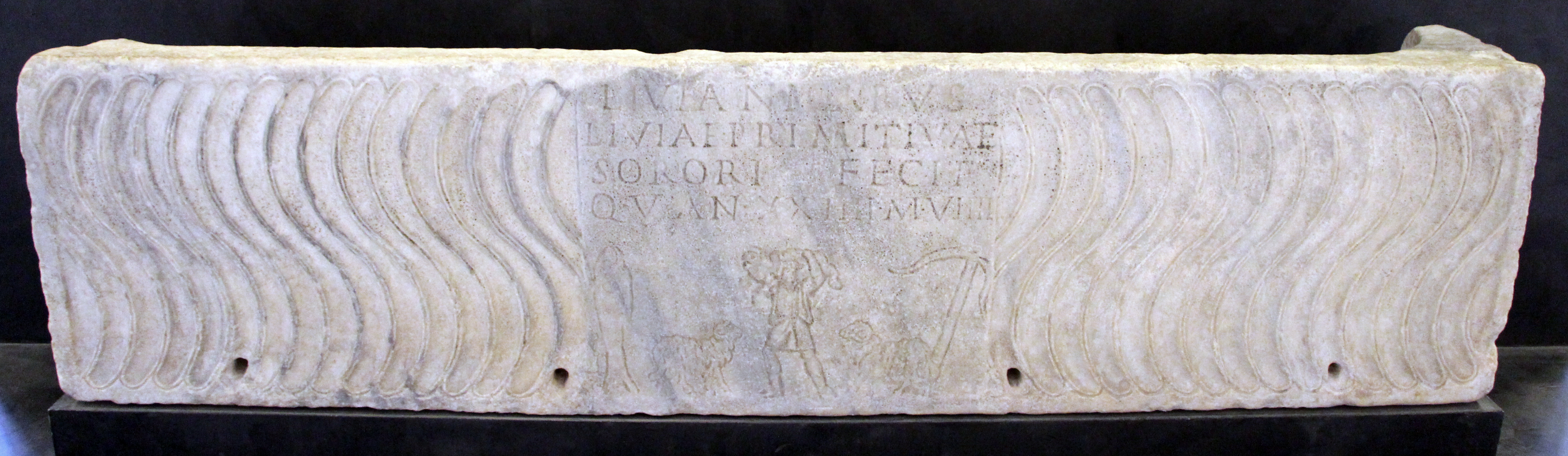
Fragmentary Front of the Sarcophagus of Livia Primitiva, 200–225

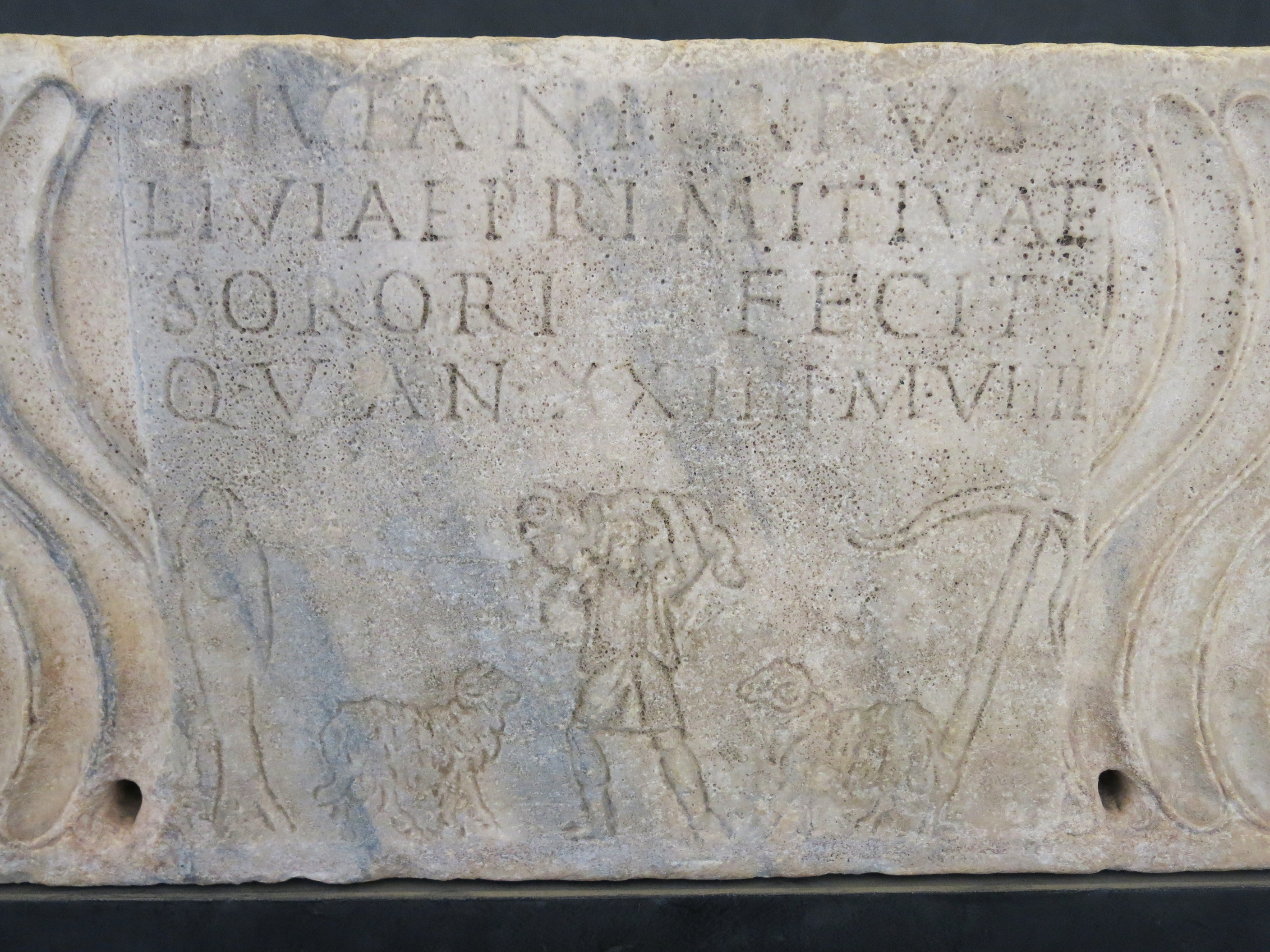
Plaque of the sarcophagus of Livia Primitiva. The text is Livia Primitiva dead at 24 years and 9 months old, regreted by her sister Livia Nicarus. The image of Good Shepherd surrounded by His sheep, presence of a fish and an anchor show the belonging to the Christian community.
