= Anaolsus =

Gothic chieftain

Anaolsus (died 430) was a Gothic chieftain who took part in a military campaign in 430, during the reign of Theodoric I, with the intention of capturing Arles.

The only record we have of Anaolsus' existence comes from the Chronicon of Hydatius:

92: Per Aetium comitem, haud procul de Arelate, quaedam Gothorum manus extinguitur, Anaolso optimate eorum capto.

— Hydatius, Chronicon

92: The comitem [count] Aetius exterminated, not far from Arelate [Arles], an armed group of Goths and captured Anaolsus, their leader.

— Hydatius, Chronicon

This military campaign highlights the independence of action of the Gothic nobility, even after the foedus with Rome in 418. In fact, between this year and 439, several military actions of independent comitatus from royal power have been documented. These comitates could have been enlisted as auxiliaries in Roman armies in Aquitaine, negotiating directly with Rome.

== See also ==
- Gothic revolt of Anaolsus
