= Battle of Toulouse (458) =

458 battle

Date	458
Location	Tolosa, Gallia Narbonensis I (modern Toulouse, France) 43.6045°N 1.444°E
Result	Roman victory

Belligerents
Visigoths	Western Roman Empire

Commanders and leaders
Theodoric II	Majorian

Strength
Unknown	Unknown

Casualties and losses
Unknown	Unknown

The Battle of Toulouse was fought in the Gothic War between the Visigoths and the Western Roman Empire in 458. The battle was part of a great mid-winter expedition made across the alps by Emperor Majorian, taking a large army from Italy into Gaul with the goal of restoring the region to Roman rule after the disastrous reign of Avitus. Majorian and the Visigothic king Theodoric II fought a battle at Toulouse, in which the Visigoths were defeated. Majorian thereafter secured the cooperation of the Visigoths against the Suebi in Spain. However, fighting resumed, and Theodoric was finally defeated at Orléans in 463.

== See also ==
- Battle of Toulouse (439)

== Sources ==
- Jaques, Tony (2007). Dictionary of Battles and Sieges: P-Z. Greenwood Publishing Group. ISBN 978-0313335396.
