= Sarcophagus of Stilicho =

Early Christian era sarcophagus

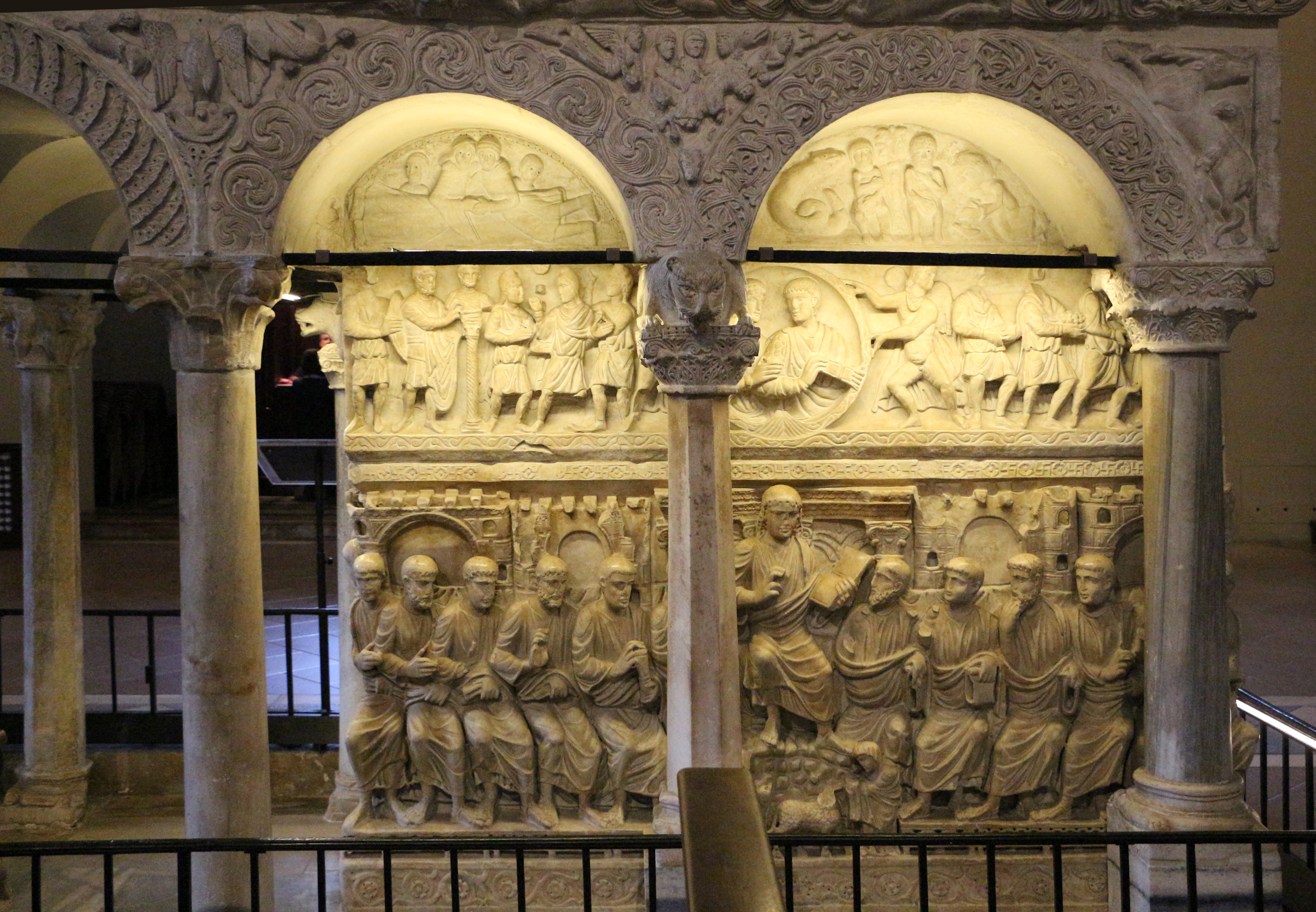
Jesus with apostles

The so-called Sarcophagus of Stilicho is a marble Early Christian sarcophagus used since before the 10th-century as the base for the pulpit of the church of Sant'Ambrogio in Milan, Italy. It appears to have been made between 387 and 390, two decades before the namesake general Stilicho's death, and is thus likely not associated with him. The sarcophagus probably does not contain the body of Stilicho.

== Description ==
The sarcophagus was carved from marble from quarries near Como, but appears to date stylistically from circa 390 and the reign of Theodosius the Great. The sarcophagus has solid and measured rhythms and a "greater sense of modeling." It is decorated and ornamented. The sarcophagus allows for a unified vision of Jesus and his apostles on the front side of the sarcophagus. Beneath a scene of Jesus teaching his apostles 12 sheep are depicted. The panels depict both New and Old Testament scenes including:

- Christ giving law to St Peter
- Christ among the Apostles
- Sacrifice of Isaac

The sarcophagus is made of Italian Carrara marble, and was probably manufactured in either Rome or Mediolanum (Milan). The cost of its carving technique has been estimated at 50,000 or up to 100,000 Diocletianic-era denarii.

== Gallery ==
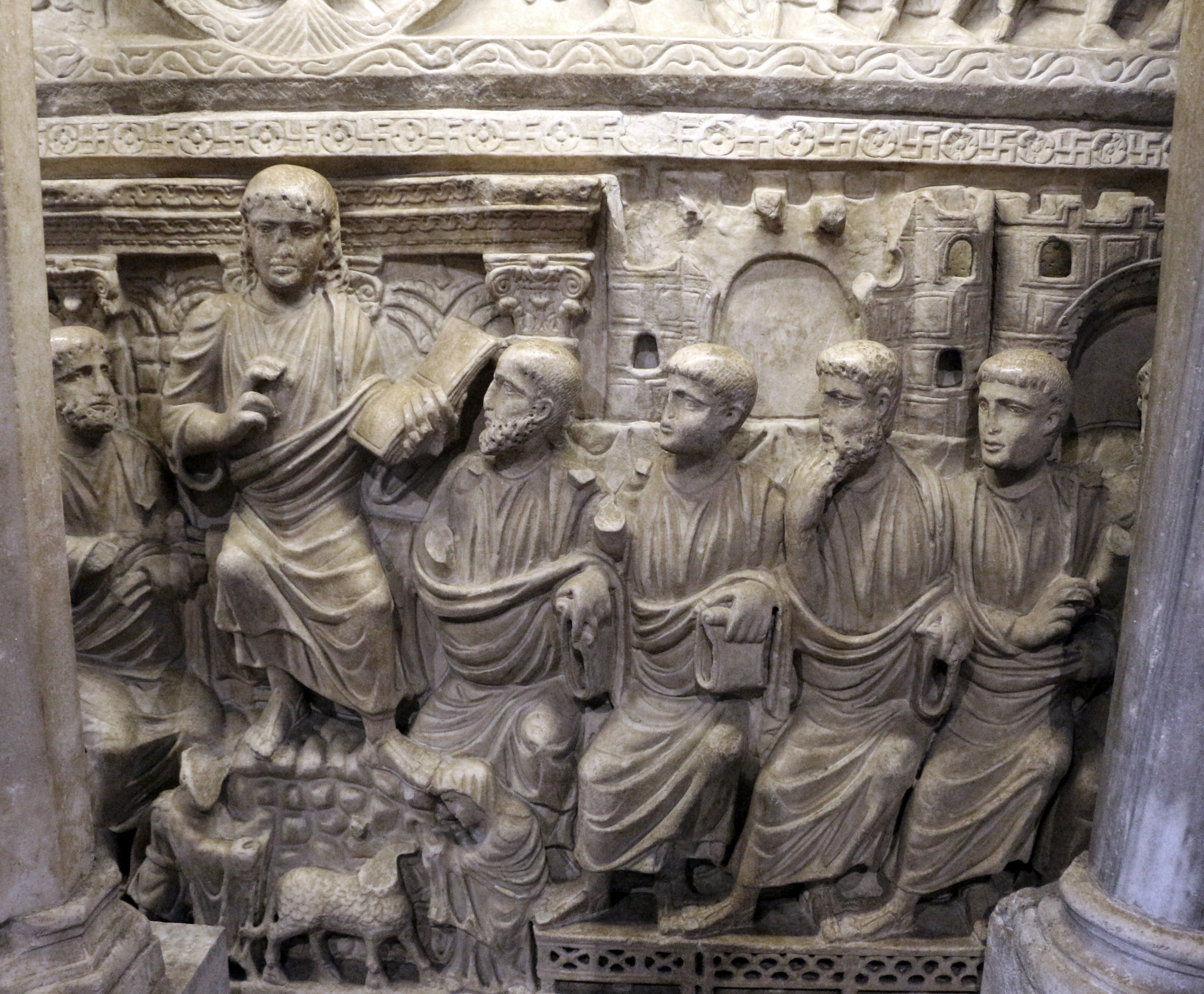
Jesus among the Apostles

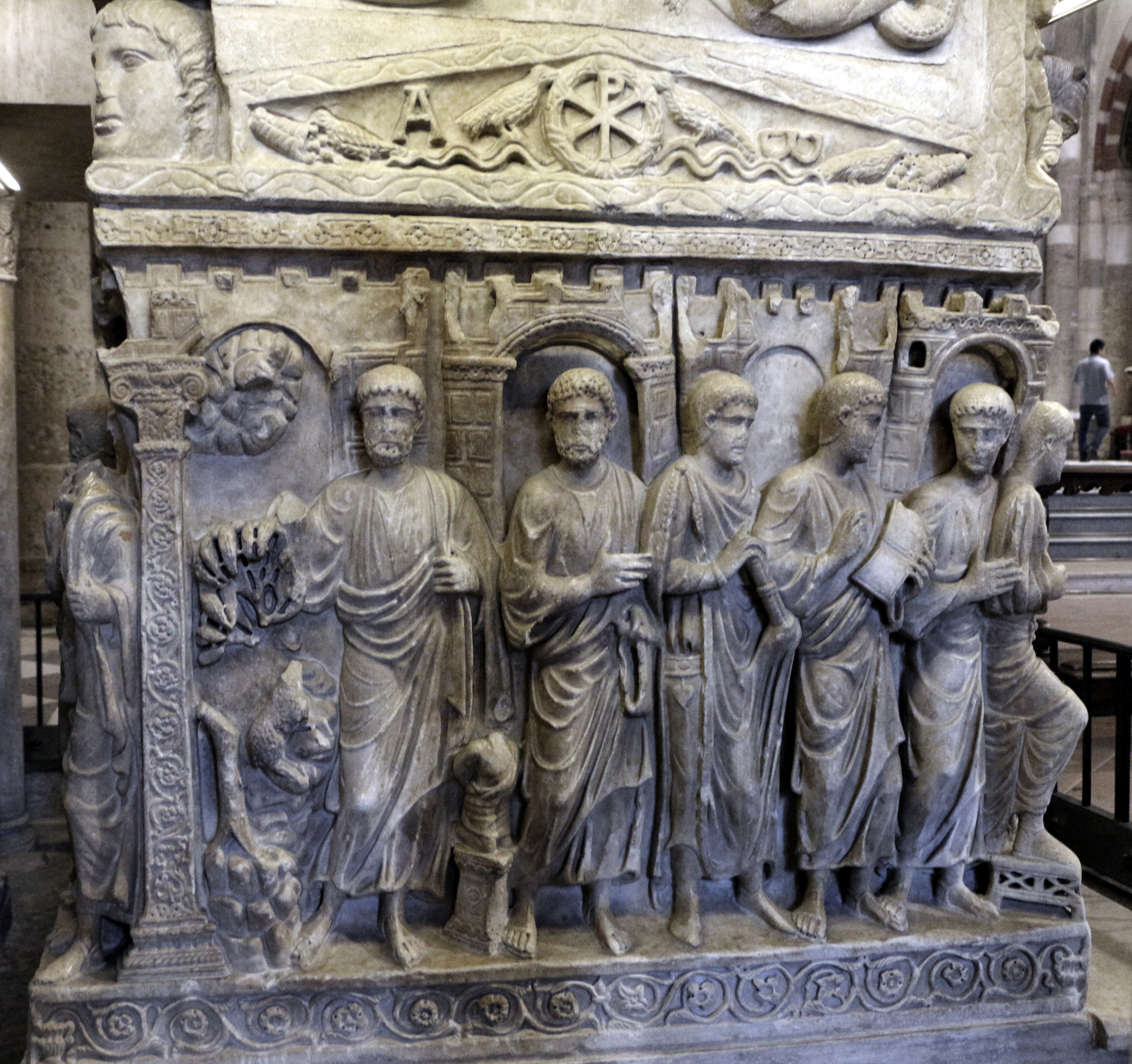
side panel

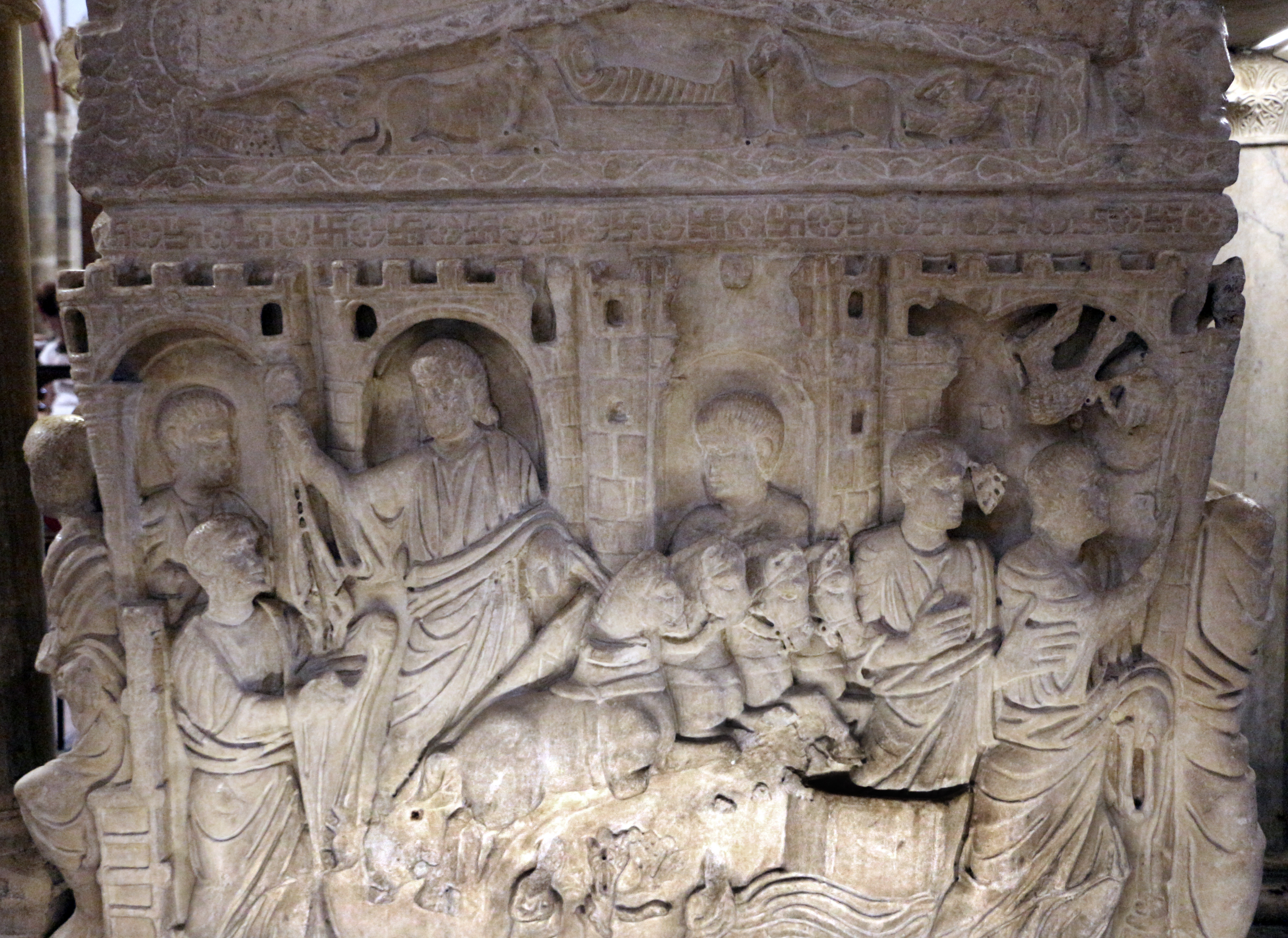
Triumph with quadriga
