= Siege of Arles (425) =

425 siege

- Part of Gothic revolt of Theodoric I
Date	425
Location	Arelate, Gallia Viennensis II (now Arles, France) 43.677°N 4.628°E
Result	Roman-Hunnic victory

Belligerents
Visigoths	Western Roman Empire; Huns

Commanders and leaders
Theodoric I	Flavius Aetius

Strength
Unknown	Unknown

Casualties and losses
Unknown	Unknown

The Battle of Arles was fought between the Visigoths and a Roman-Hunnic alliance in 425. The Visigoths and the Romans had previously been in peace, but in 425 the Visigothic king Theodoric I broke the peace treaty and invaded Gaul, laying siege to Arles. He was defeated and driven away by the Romans, under the leadership of Flavius Aetius, and their Hunnic allies. Theodoric thereafter made peace again, instead turning his sights on the Vandals in Hispania.

== See also ==
- Gothic revolt of Theodoric I

== Sources ==
- Jaques, Tony (2007). Dictionary of Battles and Sieges: A-E. Greenwood Publishing Group. ISBN 978-0313335372.
