= Merobaudes (poet) =

Poet

Flavius Merobaudes was a 5th-century Latin rhetorician and poet.

Merobaudes was a Roman of Frankish origin who was raised in Spain, and likely was a descendant of the famous general of the same name who flourished during the fourth century.

He was the official laureate of Valentinian III and Aetius. Until the beginning of the 19th century he was known only from the notice of him in the Chronicle (year 443) of his contemporary Hydatius, where he is praised as a poet and orator, and mention is made of statues set up in his honour. He was part of Aetius's army that campaigned in the Alps.

In 1813 the base of a statue was discovered at Rome, with a long inscription belonging to the year 435 (CIL VI 1724) upon Flavius Merobaudes, celebrating his merits as warrior and poet. Ten years later, B. G. Niebuhr discovered some Latin verses on a palimpsest in the monastery of St Gall, the authorship of which was traced to Merobaudes, owing to the great similarity of the language in the prose preface to that of the inscription.

Formerly the only piece known under the name of Merobaudes was a short poem (30 hexameters) De Christo, attributed to him by one manuscript, to Claudian by another; but Ebert is inclined to dispute the claim of Merobaudes to be considered either the author of the De Christo or a Christian.

The Panegyric and minor poems have been edited by Niebuhr (1824); by Immanuel Bekker in the Bonn Corpus scriptorum hist. (1836); the De Christo in T. Birt's Claudian (1892), where the authorship of Merobaudes is upheld; most recently F. Bücheler and A. Riese, Anthologia latina sive poesis latinae supplementum (2nd ed. of vol. 1, Leipzig, 1894–1926) 1, 2: pp. 327–328, no. 878. See also A. Ebert, Geschichte der Literatur des Mittelalters im Abendlande (1889). English translation by F.M. Clover, "Flavius Merobaudes: A Translation and Historical Commentary", Transactions of the American Philosophical Society, New Series, Vol. 61, No. 1 (January, 1971), pp. 1–78

== Editions ==
- Clover, Frank M. (1971). Flavius Merobaudes. A Translation and Historical Commentary. Philadelphia: Transactions of the American Philosophical Society. ISBN 978-1422375563.

== Sources and further reading ==
- John Robert Martindale: Fl. Merobaudes. In: The Prosopography of the Later Roman Empire (PLRE). Vol. 2, Cambridge University Press, Cambridge 1980, ISBN 0-521-20159-4, p. 756–758.
