= Bassus =

Bassus is a Latin adjective meaning "thick, fat, stumpy, short" and may refer to:

- Bassus (wasp), a genus of braconid wasps

It was also the name of:

== Government and military ==
- Lucius Annius Bassus, (fl. 1st century CE) senator during the reign of Vespasian, commanded a legion under Marcus Antonius Primus
- Quintus Caecilius Bassus, (fl. 1st century BCE) fought under Pompey during Caesar's civil war
- Anicius Auchenius Bassus (c. 325 – after 385), Prefect of Rome
- Anicius Auchenius Bassus (consul 408), Roman consul
- Anicius Auchenius Bassus (consul 431), Roman consul
- Gaius Julius Quadratus Bassus (70–117), Roman senator and general
- Gaius Julius Bassus (c. 45 – aft. 101), Roman senator
- Titus Pomponius Bassus, Roman senator
- Gaius Pomponius Bassus Terentianus (fl. 2nd century), Roman military officer and senator
- Pomponius Bassus (consul 211) (175–221), Roman senator and consul
- Pomponius Bassus (consul 259) (220 – after 271), Roman senator and consul
- Junius Bassus (fl. 318–331), Roman praetorian prefect and consul in 331
- Junius Bassus Theotecnius (317–359), Roman politician
- Lucilius Bassus, Roman legatus appointed by Emperor Vespasian
- Lucius Caesonius Ovinius Rufinus Manilius Bassus (or Rufinius) (c. 227 – c. 300), Roman consul in 260 and 284
- Caesonius Bassus, Roman consul in 317
- Lucius Valerius Septimius Bassus (c. 328 – after 379), Praefectus Urbi Romae
- Publius Ventidius Bassus, Roman general
- Septimius Bassus (c. 270 – aft. 319), Roman politician

== Others ==
- Gavius Bassus, 1st century BCE grammarian
- Julius Bassus, 1st century BCE-1st century CE orator mentioned by Seneca
- Sepullius Bassus, 1st century BCE-1st century CE orator mentioned by Seneca
- Silius Bassus, another obscure orator mentioned by Seneca
- Lollius Bassus, fl. 1st century CE, author of several epigrams
- Lucilius Bassus, a name used by the orator Cicero in his Epistulae ad Atticum (12.5) as proverbial for a vain and worthless author
- Bassus (poet), 1st century CE Roman poet and subject of an epigram of Martial
- Aufidius Bassus, Roman historian
- Cesellius Bassus, (died 66), Roman charlatan
- Caesius Bassus (died 79), Roman lyric poet
- Cassianus Bassus (fl. late 6th/early 7th century), called Scholasticus, one of the geoponici
- Saleius Bassus, Roman epic poet
- Saint Bassus of Nice (died c. 248–251), bishop of Nice, martyred under Decius

== See also ==
- Basilica of Junius Bassus, a civil basilica on the Esquiline Hill in Rome
- Sarcophagus of Junius Bassus, early Christian Sarcophagus used by Junius Bassus
