= Anicius Auchenius Bassus =

Anicius Auchenius Bassus may refer to:

- Anicius Auchenius Bassus (prefect) (fl. 382–384), Roman politician
- Anicius Auchenius Bassus (consul 408), Roman politician and son of the prefect
- Anicius Auchenius Bassus (consul 431), Roman high official and son of the 408 consul
