= Ursus (praefectus urbi) =

Ursus (Greek: Οὖρσος; floruit 415–416) was a politician of the Eastern Roman Empire, praefectus urbi of Constantinople in 415–416.

== Life ==
In 415 Ursus was praefectus urbi of Constantinople. On September 4, he escorted the relics of Joseph and Zechariah that were brought in the Great Church; he is attested in office by laws issued on October 31, 415, and February 17, 416. In 415 the Western Emperor, Honorius, had defeated an usurper, Priscus Attalus; on June 28, 416, Ursus celebrated the event with shows in the theatre. That same year, he is also attested in office by a law addressed to him and issued on July 23, while on September 30 he escorted Emperor Theodosius II, returning to Constantinople from Heraclea.

== Sources ==
- Martindale, John R., ed. (1980). "Vrsus 3". The Prosopography of the Later Roman Empire: Volume II, AD 395–527. Cambridge: Cambridge University Press. p. 1192. ISBN 0-521-20159-4.

Preceded by Priscianus	Praefectus urbi of Constantinople; 415-416	Succeeded by Aetius
