= Turrania gens =

Ancient Roman family

The gens Turrania, occasionally written Turania or Tyrannia, was a minor plebeian family at ancient Rome. Members of this gens are first mentioned in the time of Varro, but none of them ever rose any higher than the praetorship.

== Origin ==
The nomen Turranius belongs to a class of gentilicia formed from the names of places ending in -as, and cognomina ending in -anus, usually also derived from place-names.

== Members ==
This list includes abbreviated praenomina. For an explanation of this practice, see filiation.

- Decimus Turranius Niger, a friend of both Varro and Quintus Cicero, with whom he traveled to Cilicia, when Cicero was serving as legate to his brother, proconsul of that province in 51 BC. Varro dedicated the second book of Rerum Rusticarum, a treatise on agricultural topics, to Turranius. He might be the same person as Turranius Gracilis.
- Manius Turranius, praetor in 44 BC. Following the murder of Caesar, Marcus Antonius offered him the governorship of a province, which Turranius declined. In his third Philippic, Cicero describes this as the act of an innocent man of the highest integrity.
- Turranius, a tragic poet mentioned by Ovid in one of his letters from Pontus, celebrating the fame of the poets remaining at Rome, amongst whom Ovid had kept company, instead languishing in exile.
- Gaius Turranius, governor of Egypt from 7 to 4 BC, and praefectus annonae in AD 14, the year that Augustus died. Upon the accession of Tiberius, he was one of the first officials to offer his allegiance to the new emperor. He still held this post in AD 48, and some time after this was succeeded by Pompeius Paulinus.
- Spurius Turranius L. f. Sp. n. L. pr. Proculus Gellianus, held a number of minor appointments under the early emperors, including prefect of the Cohors I Gaetulorum, a cohort of auxilia, and a military tribune in one of the legions. He had been a flamen. Gellianus was praefectus jure dicundo of Lavinium, and honored by a decree of the decurions at Pompeii.
- Turranius Gracilis, an author cited by Pliny the Elder with respect to the length and breadth of the Straits of Gibraltar, which he reckoned to be fifteen miles long and five miles across. According to Pliny, Turranius was a native of Africa. He might be the same person as Decimus Turranius Niger.
- Turranius or Tyrannius Priscus, described by Josephus as a commander in the army of Gaius Cestius Gallus in AD 66, during the Jewish War. According to Josephus, Gessius Florus, the governor of Judaea, corrupted Priscus and a number of cavalry officers in order to divert Gallus from taking the royal palace and ending the war quickly. The same Priscus is probably the commander of the Legio VI Ferrata who was slain along with a number of other officers during the disorderly withdrawal of Gallus' forces.
- Lucius Turranius Venustus Gratianus, praetor circa AD 300.
- Turranius Rufinus, surnamed Aquileiensis, better known as Tyrannius, (Note: Rufinus, called variously Tyrannius, Turranius, or Toranus, was born at Julia Concordia, a Roman town in Venetia and Histria, and is best known for translating Greek literature into Latin. The name Tyrannius is Greek, and rarely found in Latin epigraphy—never as a gentilicium—while Turannius is a relatively common gentilicium. Greek upsilon is the equivalent of the Latin 'U', so in Greek Turranius would be rendered ΤΥΡΡΑΝΙΟΣ, easily transmuted to the more familiar ΤΥΡΑΝΝΙΟΣ. Toranus does not appear in Latin epigraphy.) Rufinus, a historian and theologian of the fourth and early fifth century.

== See also ==
- List of Roman gentes

== Bibliography ==
- Marcus Terentius Varro, Rerum Rusticarum (Rural Matters).
- Marcus Tullius Cicero, Epistulae ad Atticum, Philippicae.
- Publius Ovidius Naso (Ovid), Epistulae ex Ponto (Letters from Pontus).
- Gaius Plinius Secundus (Pliny the Elder), Historia Naturalis (Natural History).
- Flavius Josephus, Bellum Judaïcum (The Jewish War).
- Publius Cornelius Tacitus, Annales.
- Dictionary of Greek and Roman Biography and Mythology, William Smith, ed., Little, Brown and Company, Boston (1849).
- Theodor Mommsen et alii, Corpus Inscriptionum Latinarum (The Body of Latin Inscriptions, abbreviated CIL), Berlin-Brandenburgische Akademie der Wissenschaften (1853–present).
- George Davis Chase, "The Origin of Roman Praenomina", in Harvard Studies in Classical Philology, vol. VIII, pp. 103–184 (1897).
- Paul von Rohden, Elimar Klebs, & Hermann Dessau, Prosopographia Imperii Romani (The Prosopography of the Roman Empire, abbreviated PIR), Berlin (1898).
- T. Robert S. Broughton, The Magistrates of the Roman Republic, American Philological Association (1952–1986).
- Henriette Pavis d'Escurac, La préfecture de l'annone, service administratif impérial d'Auguste à Constantin (Bibliothèque des Écoles françaises d'Athènes et de Rome, No. 226), École française de Rome, Rome (1976).
