= Valentinian III =

Western Roman emperor from 425 to 455

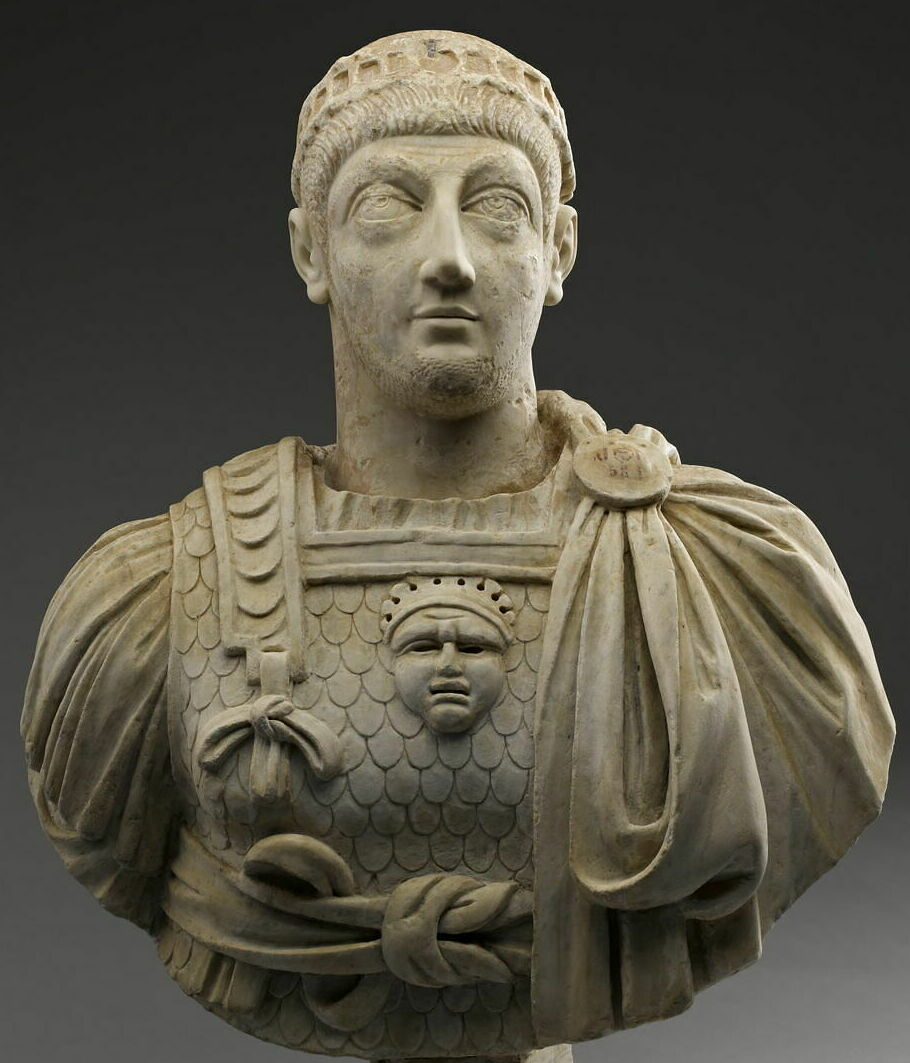
- Head portrait set in a modern bust, Louvre.

Roman emperor in the West
- Augustus: 23 October 425 – 16 March 455
- Predecessor: Joannes
- Successor: Petronius Maximus
- Eastern emperors: Theodosius II (425–450); Marcian (450–455)
- Born: 2 July 419; Ravenna
- Died: 16 March 455 (aged 35); Rome
- Burial: Mausoleum of Honorius
- Spouse: Licinia Eudoxia
- Issue: Eudocia; Placidia
Names
- Placidus Valentinianus
Regnal name
- Imperator Caesar Flavius Placidus Valentinianus Augustus
- Dynasty: Valentinian and Theodosian
- Father: Constantius III
- Mother: Galla Placidia
- Religion: Christianity

Valentinian III (Latin: Placidus Valentinianus; 2 July 419 – 16 March 455) was Roman emperor in the West from 425 to 455. Starting in childhood, his reign over the Roman Empire was one of the longest, but was dominated by civil wars among powerful generals and the barbarian invasions. He was the youngest sole emperor in the Western Roman Empire (aged 6).

He was the son of Galla Placidia and Constantius III, and as the great-grandson of Valentinian I (r. 364–375) he was the last emperor of the Valentinianic dynasty. As a grandson of Theodosius I (r. 379–395), Valentinian was also a member of the Theodosian dynasty, to which his wife, Licinia Eudoxia, also belonged. A year before assuming the rank of augustus, Valentinian was given the imperial rank of caesar by his half-cousin and co-emperor Theodosius II (r. 402–450). The augusta Galla Placidia had great influence during her son's rule, as did the military commander Flavius Aetius, who defended the western empire against Germanic and Hunnic invasions. Attila the Hun repeatedly menaced Valentinian's domains, being repulsed by a coalition under Aetius's leadership at the Battle of the Catalaunian Plains and calling off a subsequent invasion after negotiations led by Pope Leo I.

The emperor later fell out with Aetius and killed him. Valentinian was assassinated in turn by Aetius's bodyguards, ending a reign marked by the ongoing collapse of the western empire.

== Family and infancy ==
Valentinian was born on 2 July 419 in Ravenna, the capital of the Western Roman Empire, as the only son of Galla Placidia and Constantius III, who briefly ruled as emperor in 421. His mother was the younger half-sister of the western emperor Honorius (r. 393–423), while his father was at the time a patrician and the power behind the throne.

Through his mother, Valentinian was a descendant both of Theodosius I, who was his maternal grandfather, and of Valentinian I, who was the father of his maternal grandmother. It was also through his mother's side of the family that he was the nephew of Honorius and first cousin to Theodosius II (the son of Honorius' brother Arcadius), who was eastern emperor for most of Valentinian's life. Valentinian had a full sister, Justa Grata Honoria. His mother had previously been married to Ataulf of the Visigoths, and had borne a son, Theodosius, in Barcelona in 414; but the child had died early in the following year, thus eliminating an opportunity for a Romano-Visigothic line.

In either 421 or 423, Valentinian was given the title of nobilissimus by Honorius, although this title was not initially recognized in the eastern court of Theodosius II. After the death of Constantius in 421, court intrigue forced Galla Placidia to flee from Honorius and move to Constantinople, where she, Valentinian and Honoria were taken in by Theodosius.

== Early reign (423–437) ==
=== Caesar ===
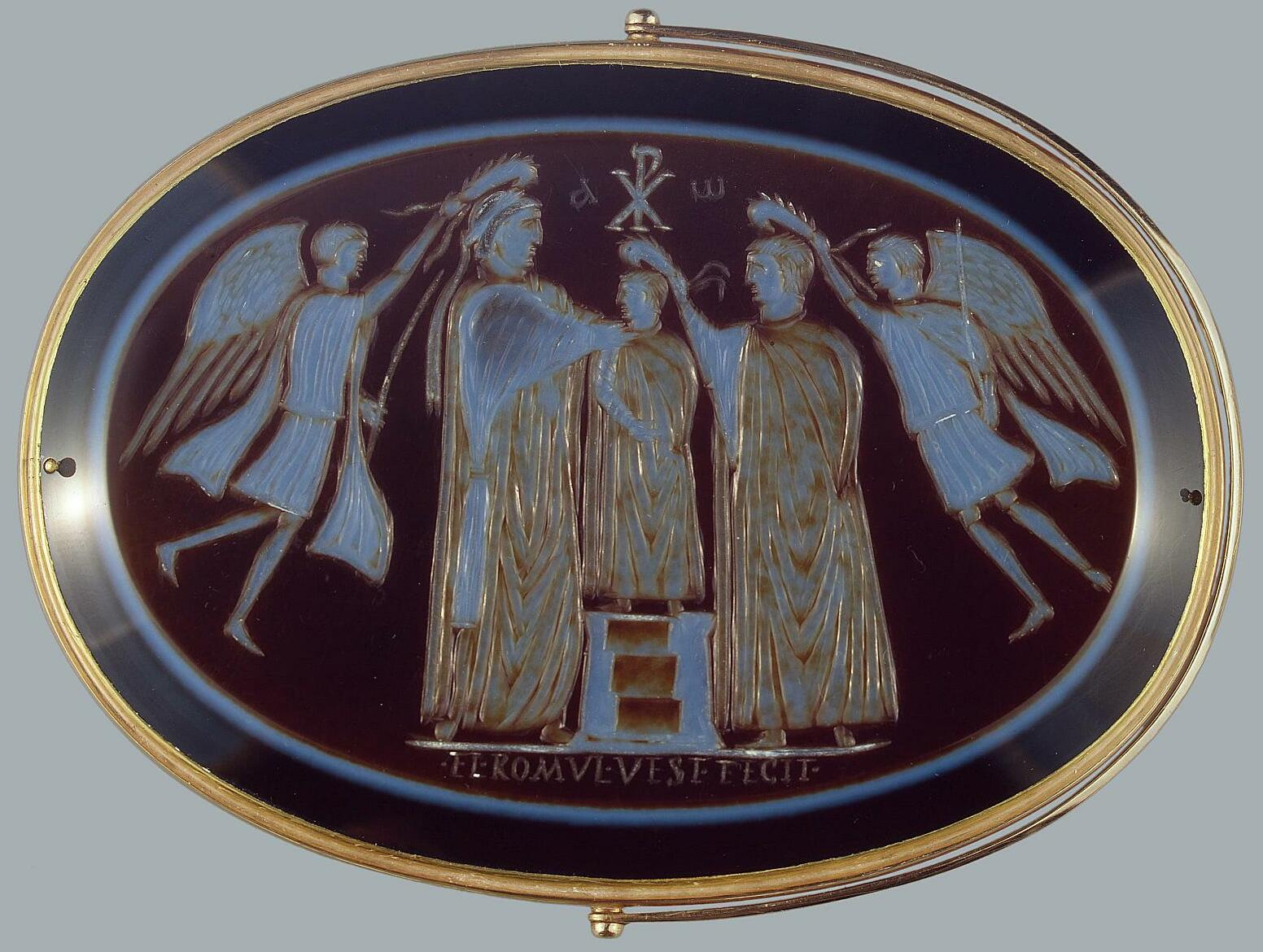
A carved and gilded gemstone depicting the coronation of Valentinian III. c. 425 A.D.

In 423, Emperor Honorius died, and his primicerius notariorum Joannes took power in Rome. To counter this threat to his power, Theodosius posthumously recognised Valentinian's father as augustus (emperor) and nominated the 5-year-old Valentinian caesar (heir-apparent) for the West in 23 October 424. Theodosius also betrothed his daughter Licinia Eudoxia to Valentinian, who eventually married her in 437 when he was 18. On 23 October 425, after Joannes had been defeated in a combined naval and land campaign, Helion, the eastern patricius et magister officiorum, installed Valentinian as augustus in Rome.

=== Augustus ===
Given his minority, the new augustus ruled under the influence of his mother Galla Placidia, one of whose first acts was to install Felix as the magister utriusque militiae in the west. This period was marked by a vigorous imperial policy and an attempt to stabilize the western provinces as far as the stretched resources of the empire could manage.

In 425, the court at Ravenna negotiated with the Huns who had accompanied Aetius to Italy in support of Joannes. The Huns agreed to leave Italy, and to evacuate the province of Pannonia Valeria, which was returned to the empire. This allowed Felix and the imperial government to restructure the defences along the Danubian provinces in 427 and 428. In addition, there were significant victories over the Visigoths in Gaul in 426/7 and 430 and the Franks along the Rhine in 428 and 432.

Nevertheless, there were significant problems that threatened the viability of the Roman state in the west. The Visigoths were a constant presence in south-eastern Gaul and could not be dislodged. The Vandals in Hispania continued their incursions, and, in 429, commenced an invasion of Mauretania Tingitana. The loss of these territories seriously impacted the state's ability to function. The burden of taxation became more and more intolerable as Rome's power decreased, and the loyalty of its remaining provinces was impaired in consequence.

The initial period of Valentinian's reign was further troubled by a power struggle among the three principal military leaders of the west – Felix, the senior magister militum praesentalis, Bonifatius, the magister militum per Africam, and Aetius, the magister militum per Gallias. In 427, Felix accused Bonifatius of treason and demanded that he return to Italy. Bonifatius refused and defeated an army sent by Felix to capture him. Weakened, Felix was unable to resist Aetius who, with the support of Galla Placidia, replaced him as magister militum praesentalis in 429, before having him killed in 430.

Bonifatius, in the meantime, had been unable to defeat Sigisvultus, whom Galla Placidia had sent to deal with the rebel. Bonifatius, therefore, entered into an agreement with the Vandals to come to his aid and, in return, they would divide the African provinces between themselves. Concerned by this turn of events and determined to hold onto the African provinces at all costs, the court at Ravenna sought reconciliation with Bonifatius, who agreed in 430 to affirm his allegiance to Valentinian III and stop the Vandal king Gaiseric.

In 431, Bonifatius was crushed and fled to Italy, abandoning western North Africa. The imperial court, and especially Galla Placidia, worried about the power being wielded by Aetius, stripped him of his command and gave it to Bonifatius. In the civil war that followed, Bonifatius defeated Aetius at the Battle of Ravenna, but died of his wounds. Aetius fled to the Huns and, with their help, was able to persuade the court to reinstate him to his old position of magister militum praesentalis in 434. As a consequence, in 435, Valentinian was forced to conclude a peace with Gaiseric, whereby the Vandals kept all their possessions in North Africa in return for a payment of tribute to the empire, while the Huns were granted new territory in Pannonia Savia to occupy.

Galla Placidia's regency came to an end in 437 when Valentinian travelled to Constantinople to marry his fiancée, Licinia Eudoxia. On his return to Rome, he was nominally the emperor, but in truth the management of imperial policy in the west was in the hands of Aetius.

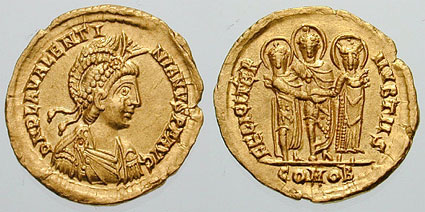
Solidus minted in Thessalonica to celebrate Valentinian III's marriage to Licinia Eudoxia, daughter of the Eastern Emperor Theodosius II. On the reverse, the three of them in their wedding costume.

== Ascendancy of Aetius (437–455) ==
From 436 to 439, Aetius was focused on the situation in Gaul. Serious Gothic defeats in 437 and 438 were undone by a Roman defeat in 439, which saw the status quo restored through a new truce. He also enjoyed initial success against the Franks and the Burgundians, as well as putting down a revolt by the Bagaudae by 437. In 438, peace was also achieved with the Suebi in Spain, the same year Valentinian's daughter, Eudocia, was born.

With Aetius occupied in Gaul, Valentinian was unable to do anything to prevent the Vandals completely overrunning the remaining western African provinces, culminating in the fall of Carthage on 19 October 439. This was a major blow because taxes and foodstuffs from these wealthy provinces supported Rome. By 440, Vandal fleets were ravaging Sicily and Aetius coordinated a joint response with the eastern court, with large numbers of Roman troops sent to defend the island from Gaiseric. Hunnic invasions forced the government to abandon this defense and transfer the troops to the Danube.

In 442, Aetius and Valentinian were compelled to acknowledge the Vandal conquests of Proconsular Africa, western Numidia, and Byzacena, in exchange for which Rome was returned the now devastated provinces of Tripolitana, Mauretania Sitifensis, Mauretania Caesariensis, and the remainder of Numidia. Gaiseric soon disregarded this arrangement and retook Mauretania Sitifensis and Mauretania Caesariensis, as well as taking Sardinia and Corsica and conducting devastating raids on Sicily.

Unable to pacify Gaiseric by military means, Aetius decided that linking him to the imperial dynasty would be the next best thing. Consequently, sometime before 446, he convinced Valentinian to agree to a marriage between his eldest daughter, Eudocia, and Gaiseric's son, Huneric. The idea came to nothing, since Huneric was already married to the daughter of the king of the Visigoths.

The imperial presence in Hispania continued to diminish during the early-to-mid 440s as the Suebi extended their control. By 444 the Spanish provinces of Lusitania and Hispania Baetica had been lost, and Roman authority in Hispania Tarraconensis was challenged by continued Bagaudic uprisings. This loss of territory caused severe financial problems, with the Roman state openly acknowledging that there was insufficient revenue to meet its military needs.

The emperor issued a law on 14 July 444, ending bureaucrats' exemption from the recruitment tax. In that year, two additional taxes were issued in Valentinian's name, one a sales tax of around four percent and another on the senatorial class, specifically to recruit and supply new troops. Senators of illustrious rank were required to contribute the money for maintaining three soldiers, senators of the second class money for one soldier, and senators of the third class one-third the cost of maintaining a soldier. Valentinian himself was not exempt, sacrificing part of his reduced personal income to help the State in its financial straits.

== Hunnic invasions ==
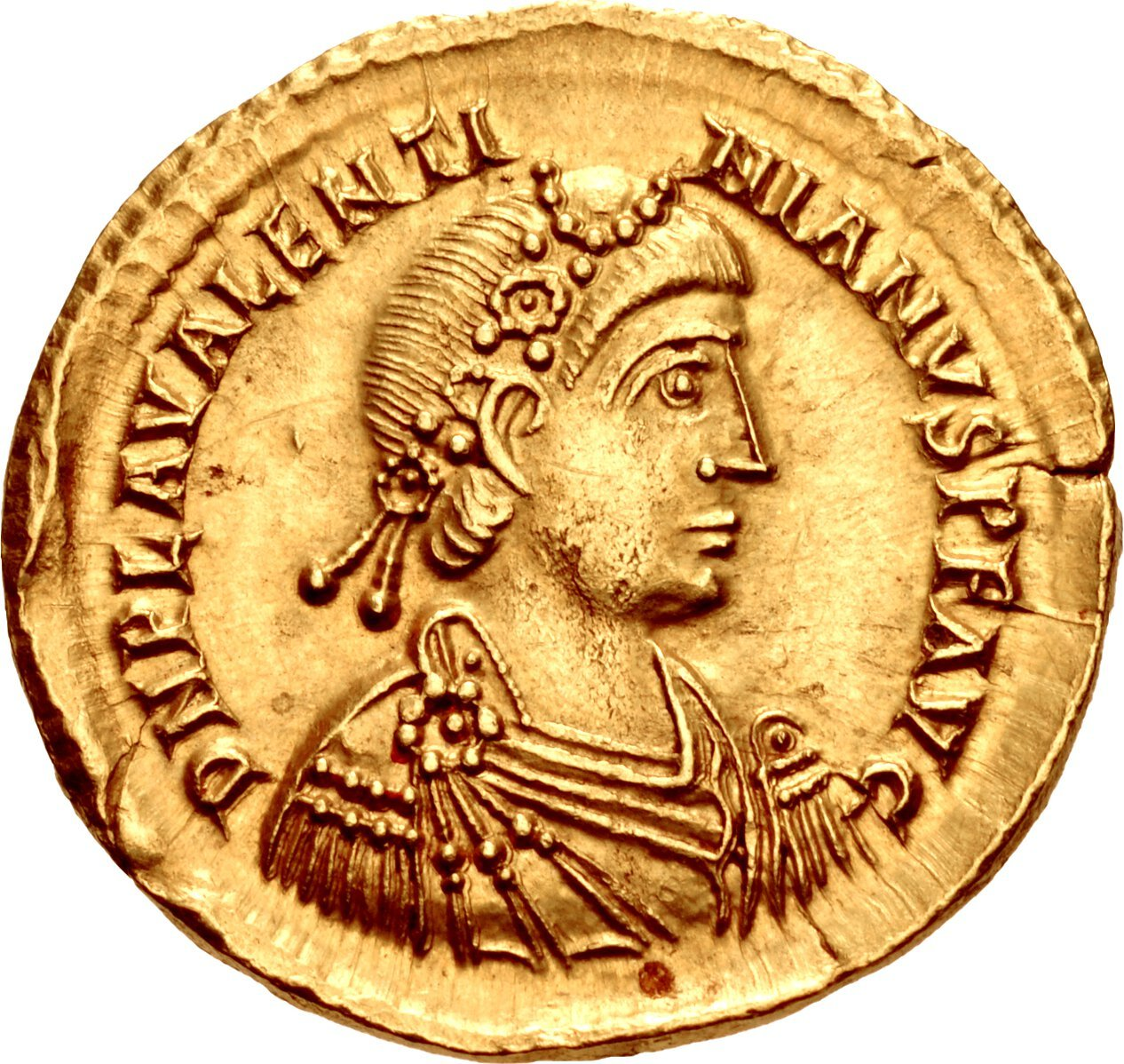
Solidus of Valentinian III marked: d·n· pla· valentinianus p·f· aug·

In the 440s Valentinian made the Hunnic chieftain Attila honorary magister militum of the western empire, hoping thereby to reduce the threat the Huns posed to the Danubian provinces. To the relief of the western court, Attila concentrated on raiding the eastern empire's provinces in the Balkans from 441 through to 449. In 449, Honoria wrote to Attila, offering him half the western empire if he would rescue her from an unwanted political marriage arranged by her brother Valentinian.

Attila had been looking for a pretext to invade the West. In 450 he secured peace with the eastern court and entered the Gallic provinces, having allegedly been bribed by the Vandal king Gaiseric to attack Gaul's population of Visigoths. Valentinian was furious over the invasion. The man who had carried Honoria's message to Attila was tortured to reveal all the details of the arrangement and then beheaded, and the emperor spared Honoria herself only after a great deal of persuasion from Galla Placidia.

In early 451, Attila crossed the Rhine and entered the Belgic provinces, capturing Divodurum Mediomatricum (Metz) on 7 April. Aetius gathered together a coalition of forces, including Visigoths and Burgundians, and raced to prevent Attila from taking the city of Aurelianum (Orléans), successfully forcing the Huns to retreat. The Roman-Germanic forces met Hunnic forces at the Battle of the Catalaunian Plains, resulting in a victory for Aetius, who sought to retain his position by allowing Attila and a significant number of his troops to escape.

Attila regrouped, and, in 452, invaded Italy. He sacked and destroyed Aquileia and took Verona and Vincentia (Vicenza) as well. Aetius was shadowing the Huns but did not have the troops to attack, so the road to Rome was open. Although Ravenna was Valentinian's usual residence, he and the court moved back to Rome as Attila approached.

Valentinian sent Pope Leo I and two leading senators to negotiate with Attila. This embassy, combined with a plague among Attila's troops, the threat of famine, and news that the Eastern Emperor Marcian had launched an attack on Hun homelands along the Danube, forced Attila to turn around and leave Italy. The death of Attila in Pannonia in 453 and the power struggle that erupted between his sons ended the Hunnic threat to the empire.

== Assassination ==
With the Hun invasion thwarted, Valentinian felt secure enough to begin plotting to have Aetius killed, egged on by Petronius Maximus, a high ranking senator who bore Aetius a personal grudge, and his chamberlain, the eunuch Heraclius. Aetius, whose son had married Valentinian's youngest daughter, Placidia, was murdered by Valentinian on 21 September 454. The ancient historian Priscus reported that Aetius was presenting a financial statement before the Emperor when Valentinian suddenly leapt from his throne and accused him of drunken depravity. He held him responsible for the empire's tribulations and accused him of plotting to take the empire away from him. Valentinian then drew his sword and together with Heraclius, rushed at the weaponless Aetius and struck him on the head, killing him on the spot. When Valentinian later boasted that he had done well to dispose of Aetius in such a way, a counsellor famously replied "Whether well or not, I do not know. But know that you have cut off your right hand with your left."

On March 16 of the following year, the emperor himself was assassinated in Rome by two Scythian followers of Aetius: Optelas and Thraustelas. According to Priscus, these men were put up to it by Petronius Maximus, whose aims of political advancement were thwarted by Heraclius. He may also have been taking revenge for the rape of his wife Lucina by Valentinian. The assassination occurred as Valentinian rode his horse on the Campus Martius. As the emperor dismounted to practise archery, the conspirators attacked. Optelas struck Valentinian on the side of the head, and when he turned to see who had hit him, Optelas delivered the death-blow. Meanwhile, Thraustelas slew Heraclius. Priscus reports a curious occurrence: a swarm of bees descended on the corpse of Valentinian and sucked up his blood.

The day after the assassination Petronius Maximus had himself proclaimed emperor by the remnants of the Western Roman army after paying a large donative. He was not as prepared as he thought to take over and stabilize the depleted empire, however; after a reign of only 11 weeks, Maximus was stoned to death by a Roman mob. King Gaiseric and his Vandals captured Rome a few days later and sacked it for two weeks.

== Character and legacy ==
Valentinian's reign is marked by the dismemberment of the Western Empire; by the time of his death, virtually all of North Africa, all of western Spain, and the majority of Gaul had passed out of Roman hands. He is described as spoiled, pleasure-loving, and heavily influenced by sorcerers and astrologers, but also devoted to religion, contributing to churches of Saint Lawrence in both Rome and Ravenna.

Some historians throughout the 18th to 20th century, including Edward Gibbon and John Bagnall Bury, had unfavorable views of Valentinian III.

== Portrayals ==
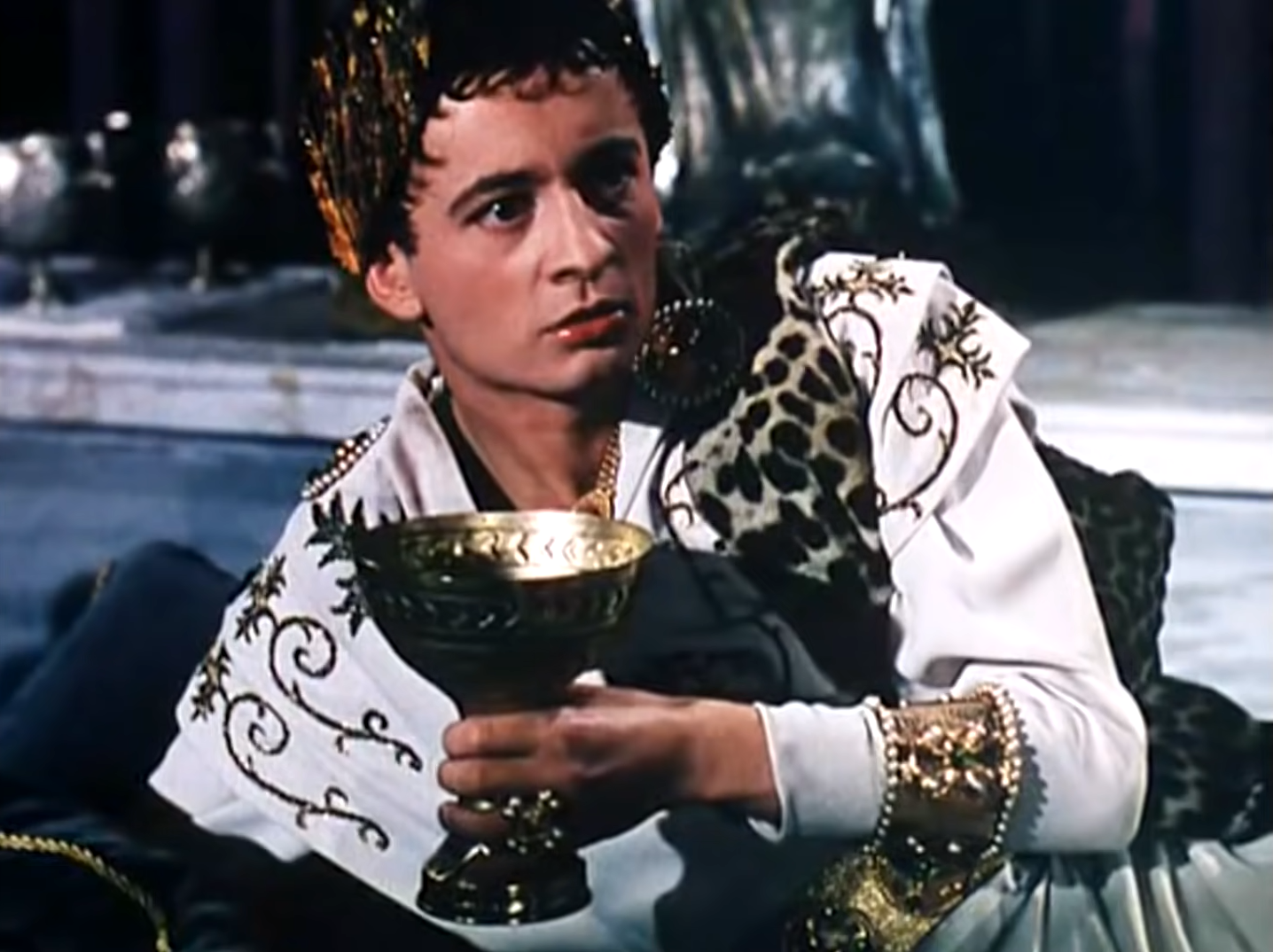
Valentinian portrayed by Claude Laydu in Attila

He is played by Claude Laydu in the 1954 film Attila and by Reg Rogers in the 2001 miniseries Attila.

Valentinian III Valentinianic dynasty Born: 2 July 419 Died: 16 March 455
Regnal titles
Preceded by Honorius	Western Roman emperor 425–455	Succeeded by Petronius Maximus
Political offices
Preceded by Castinus; Victor	Roman consul 425–426 with Theodosius Augustus	Succeeded by Hierius; Ardabur
Preceded by Florentius; Dionysius	Roman consul II; 430 with Theodosius Augustus	Succeeded by Anicius Auchenius Bassus; Antiochus Chuzon
Preceded by Aspar; Areobindus	Roman consul III; 435 with Theodosius Augustus	Succeeded by Anthemius Isidorus; Senator
Preceded by Theodosius Augustus; Festus	Roman consul IV; 440 with Anatolius	Succeeded by Cyrus of Panopolis
Preceded by Theodosius Augustus; Albinus	Roman consul V 445 with Nomus	Succeeded by Aetius; Q. Aurelius Symmachus
Preceded by Astyrius; Florentius Romanus Protogenes	Roman consul VI; 450 with Gennadius Avienus	Succeeded by Marcian Augustus; Valerius Faltonius Adelfius
Preceded by Aetius; Studius	Roman consul VII; 455 with Procopius Anthemius	Succeeded by Avitus Augustus (West); Iohannes (East); Varanes (East)
