= Taurus (consul 428) =

Flavius Taurus (Greek: Ταύρος; died 449) was a politician of the Eastern Roman Empire, Consul in 428.

He was the son of Aurelianus, Consul in 400 and powerful Praetorian prefect of the East, and nephew of the Taurus who was Consul in 361. His son, Flavius Taurus Clementinus Armonius Clementinus, was consul in 513.

As his father, his grandfather and his uncle Flavius Eutychianus before him, he was Consul, in 428, and Praetorian prefect (of the East); he had also the rank of patricius between 433 and 434.

== Bibliography ==
- Martindale, John R.; Jones, A. H. M.; Morris, John, eds. (1971). The Prosopography of the Later Roman Empire: Volume I, AD 260–395. Cambridge: Cambridge University Press. p. 1146. ISBN 0-521-07233-6.

Political offices
Preceded by Flavius Hierius, Flavius Ardabur	Consul of the Roman Empire; 428 with Flavius Felix	Succeeded by Flavius Florentius, Flavius Dionysius
Preceded by Flavius Hierius	Praetorian prefect of the East; 433–434	Succeeded by Flavius Anthemius Isidorus
Preceded by Hermocrates	Praetorian prefect of the East; 445	Succeeded by Flavius Constantinus
