= Idyll XX =

Poem attributed to Theocritus

Idyll XX, also called Βουκολίσκος ('The Young Countryman'), is a bucolic poem doubtfully attributed to the 3rd century BC Greek poet Theocritus. A neatherd, chafing because a city woman disdains him, protests that he is handsome, that Gods have been known to make love to country-folk, and that she deserves no lover at all. For grammatical and other reasons, some critics consider this Idyll apocryphal.

== Summary ==
A herdsman, who had been contemptuously rejected by Eunica, a girl of the town, protests that he is beautiful, and that Eunica is prouder than Cybele, Selene, and Aphrodite, all of whom loved mortal herdsmen. He calls down upon her the curse of perpetual celibacy.

== Analysis ==
Taunting me, thus she spoke: 'Get thee gone from me! Wouldst thou kiss me, thou—a neatherd?'

This poem is a monologue, but includes dumb characters—the shepherds of line 19. Stylistic considerations belie the tradition which ascribes it to Theocritus.

== See also ==
- Cyrus of Panopolis

== Sources ==
- Gow, A. S. F., ed. (1950). Theocritus. Vol. 2. Cambridge: Cambridge University Press. pp. 364–8.

Attribution:

- Edmonds, J. M., ed. (1919). The Greek Bucolic Poets (3rd ed.). William Heinemann. pp. 237–43.
- Lang, Andrew, ed. (1880). Theocritus, Bion, and Moschus. London: Macmillan and Co. pp. 96–8.
