= Rufinus (praetorian prefect under Theodosius II) =

Rufinus (Greek: Ρουφίνος; fl. 431–432) was a praetorian prefect of the East, one of the most important officials of the Eastern Roman Empire.

== Life ==
Rufinus was a relative of Emperor Theodosius II (r. 402–450). He is attested in office between March 431 and March 432 by two letters of Isidore of Pelusium. One of these letters (letter 178) contained a reproach towards the prefect for ignoring the wrongdoings of the governor of Cyrenius. This Rufinus might be the successor of Antiochus Chuzon in this office.

== Sources ==
- Martindale, John R., ed. (1980). "Rufinus 8". The Prosopography of the Later Roman Empire: Volume II, AD 395–527. Cambridge: Cambridge University Press. p. 953. ISBN 0-521-20159-4.

Preceded by Antiochus Chuzon	Praetorian prefect of the East; 431–432	Succeeded by Hierius (II)
