= Ardabur =

Ardabur is the name of:

- Ardabur (consul 427), Roman-Alanic general and politician
- Flavius Ardabur Aspar (c. 400–471), his son, general and politician
- Ardabur (consul 447) (died 471), son of Aspar, also a general and politician
