= Flavius Taurus Clementinus Armonius Clementinus =

Ancient Roman politician

Flavius Taurus Clementinus Armonius Clementinus was a Roman politician in the sixth century AD.

== Biography ==
He came from a distinguished lineage: his father was Flavius Taurus, consul of 428 AD, and his grandfather Aurelianus was Praetorian Prefect of the East from 399 to 400 AD. His great-grandfather Taurus was Praetorian Prefect of Italy under Constantius II from 355 to 361 AD.

In either 511 or 513 AD, Clementinus held the office of Comes sacrarum largitonum. In 513 AD, Clementinus was awarded the consulship together with Probus as his colleague. In that year, he received the honorific title of Patrikios (Patrician).

He was a Monophysite and supported the monk Severus (later Patriarch of Antioch) when the latter was in Constantinople from 508 to 511 AD. In 511 AD, Clementinus was present at a meeting at which the resignation of the Patriarch of Constantinople Macedonius II was discussed.

The Liverpool museum houses an ivory diptych bearing a representation of Clementinus.
