= Ablabius =

Ablabius (Greek Ἀβλάβιος), or Ablavius, was the name of several different people in the ancient world.

- Ablabius Illustrius, mentioned in the Greek Anthology
- Ablabius (consul), praetorian prefect of the East of Constantine I, from 329 to 337/338
- Ablabius (historian) (fl. 4th/5th century), writer of a history of the Goths based on Gothic legends, used by Cassiodorus and Jordanes
- Ablabius (assassin), a man who attempted to kill Justinian I in 562
