= Flavius Hermogenes =

(Flavius) Hermogenes (Greek: Έρμογένης; c. 300 – 361) was a Roman senator who served in various civilian offices from the reign of Licinius through to Constantius II.

== Biography ==
Born in the region of Pontus, according to Himerius, the career of Hermogenes (possibly Flavius Hermogenes) began when he served as a very young man at the court of the emperor Licinius. The emperor employed him in an unknown position, but used him as a messenger when he sought the advice of oracles. Himerius claimed that Hermogenes used his influence over Licinius to mitigate the emperor's harsh rule. When he reached the age of manhood, Hermogenes left Licinius’ court and began intensively studying philosophy, as well as becoming proficient in both Latin and Greek.

Returning to the imperial court at Constantinople under Constantine I, Hermogenes was probably appointed magister of one of the sacra scrinia (or perhaps Quaestor sacri palatii). In this role, he encouraged benevolent legislation, helped people in danger, secured the appointment of decent men as governor, and provided assistance to petitioners before the court. He also acted as an intermediary between the emperor and his subjects, advising the emperor of any requests and advising the supplicants of the emperor's decisions.

Hermogenes was next noted to be serving near the Danube, and this was followed by his appointment as proconsular governor of Achaea, with a rank of vir clarissimus, which he probably held during the reign of Constantius II, sometime between 350 and 358. During this time he repaired the harbor of Corinth.

Sometime before 24 August 358, Hermogenes was appointed Praetorian Prefect of Oriens. During his time in that role he dismissed Nicentius, the governor of Syria Coele for failing to supply provisions to the army. He displayed a favoritism towards Libanius, who praised his mild administrative style, but afterwards they had a falling-out. Hermogenes also received correspondence from Basil of Ancyra while Praetorian Prefect. He resigned his post before February 360, following which he was reconciled with Libanius. Hermogenes died in early 361.

Preceded by Strategius Musonianus	Praetorian prefect of the East; 430–431	Succeeded by Helpidius
