= Peter Barsymes =

Peter Barsymes (Latin: Petrus Barsumes, Greek: Πέτρος Βαρσύμης, fl. ca. 540 – ca. 565) was a senior Byzantine official, associated chiefly with public finances and administration, under Byzantine emperor Justinian I (r. 527–565).

Aside from contemporary official documents, the chief source for his life is the historian Procopius. Procopius is extremely hostile towards him, accusing him of stealing money and cheating others. A native of Syria, he was also, according to Procopius, originally a banker. At some point he gained an office in the staff of the praetorian prefecture of the East, before being appointed, some time around 540, to the post of comes sacrarum largitionum ("Count of the Sacred Largess", i.e. minister for the public treasury). In this function he was awarded the titles of honorary consul and patrician.

== Eastern Praetorian Prefecture ==
In 543, he succeeded Theodotus as praetorian prefect of the East. This included administration over Thrace, through Egypt to the Black Sea. However the provinces of Moesia II, Scythia Minor, Insulae,Caria, and Cyprus remained independent from the Eastern Prefecture. Barsymes held this position until 546.

In The Secret History, Procopius initiates a lengthy attack on Barsymes. He also uses Barsymes to criticise Empress Theodora, writing that the reason for Barsymes' appointment was to aid in the schemes of the Empress. Furthermore, he accuses him of depriving soldiers of their pay, embezzling tax money, and also making gold coinage smaller, which Procopius emphasises as having never been done before. Procopius attributes this coinage policy to Barsymes' time as minister for public treasury (comes sacrarum largitionum).

In order to replenish the treasury, he restarted the sale of offices, but his speculation with the grain supply of the capital failed. Once again Procopius uses this failure to criticise Barsymes. Procopius writes that a supply of rotted grain was sent to Byzantion, and despite being inedible, the grain was given to the cities of the Eastern Prefecture and sold for more than the best quality grain, as well as the unspoilt grain being sold to other cities with a low supply. This then led to the treasury gaining double the amount of money taxed for the original grain, but the next year the grain harvest was insufficient for the capital, leading to his dismissal by Emperor Justinian.

== Protection under Theodora ==
Despite being dismissed from Praetorian Prefecture, in 547 Barsymes was reappointed to his old office as comes sacrarum largitionum. According to Procopius, this was due to the protection of the Empress Theodora.

Procopius also claims that Barsymes placed a spell on the empress in order to gain her favour. According to Procopius, Barsymes was infatuated with magic, spirits and the Manichaeans, which he describes as a "cult".

He remained in office until ca. 550 or perhaps until 555, when he was reappointed as Praetorian prefect of the East. He kept this post until 562.

== Sources ==
- Martindale, John R., ed. (1992). The Prosopography of the Later Roman Empire: Volume III, AD 527–641. Cambridge: Cambridge University Press. pp. 999–1002. ISBN 0-521-20160-8.
- Prokopius, The Secret History: with related texts. Translated by Anthony Kaldellis (2010) Indianapolis: Hackett Publishing Company. ISBN 978-1-60384-180-1.
- Rance, Philip (2019). "The Farmer and the Soldier Should Be Friends: Justinian's Legislation on the Provisioning of Soldiers (Novel 130)". Journal of Late Antiquity. 12:2 doi:10.1353/jla.2019.0020. ISSN 1942-1273 - via Project MUSE.
- Sarris, Peter (2006). Economy and society in the age of Justinian. Cambridge: Cambridge University Press. ISBN 978-0-511-49638-7.
