= Florentius (consul 429) =

Flavius Florentius (Greek: Φλωρέντιος; fl. 422-451) was a prominent high official of the Eastern Roman Empire, who influenced imperial policy during the second quarter of the fifth century.

== Biography ==
A Syrian, on 6 November 422 he was praefectus urbi of Constantinople, in which capacity he received an edict preserved in the Codex Theodosianus (vi.8.1).

After holding another high administrative post, perhaps as praetorian prefect of Illyricum, from 21 April 428 to 11 February 430, Florentius held the second office of the Empire, the praetorian prefecture of the East. He received further the honour of the consulate in 429. On 31 January 438 and 26 November 439, Florentius was again prefect for the East. Due to the closure of the brothels of Constantinople, the treasury received less revenue, and Florentius decided to give some of his own properties to the State to compensate for the loss.

In the mid-440s, he was praetorian prefect twice again, presumably for the East. Between 444 and 448 he received the title of patricius; on 22 November of the year in which he received this title, he was commissioned by Theodosius II to participate in an investigation that was held in Constantinople on the views of Eutyches, as the Emperor trusted Florentius' orthodoxy.

In 451 he attended the Council of Chalcedon, during which he was present at the first, third, fourth and sixth sessions.

At the beginning of the reign of Marcian, Florentius and Anatolius dissuaded the emperor from supporting the uprising of the Armenians against the Sassanids. Marcian sent him to the Persian king to reassure him that Rome's intention was not to intervene.

== Bibliography ==
- Martindale, John R., ed. (1980). "Florentius 7". The Prosopography of the Later Roman Empire: Volume II, AD 395–527. Cambridge: Cambridge University Press. pp. 478–480. ISBN 0-521-20159-4.

Preceded by Flavius Felix, Flavius Taurus	Consul of the Roman Empire; 429 with Flavius Dionysius	Succeeded by Flavius Theodosius Augustus XIII, Flavius Placidus Valentinianus Augustus III
Preceded by Aetius	Praefectus urbi of Constantinople; 422	Succeeded by Severinus
Preceded by Hierius (I)	Praetorian prefect of the East (I); 428-430	Succeeded by Antiochus Chuzon
Preceded by Darius	Praetorian prefect of the East (II); 438-439	Succeeded by Cyrus of Panopolis
