= Aetius (praetorian prefect) =

Politician

Aetius (Greek: Άέτιος; fl. 419–425) was a politician of the Eastern Roman Empire, praefectus urbi of Constantinople and praetorian prefect of the East.

== Life ==
Aetius was praefectus urbi of Constantinople. He is first attested in office on February 23, 419, when an old man called Cyriacus tried to kill him in the Great Church, and again on October 4 of the same year, when he received a law preserved in the Codex Theodosianus. He also received a law dated to 409, but emended by scholars to 418, 420 or 422, in which he was to reduce the staff of the Great Church (this reduction has been suggested as a possible reason for the assassination attempt). In 421 a large open-air water reservoir called "of Aetius" was built in Constantinople; this Aetius might be the praefectus urbi, who could be still in office as his successor, Florentius, is first attested in November 422.

A law addressed to him was issued on May 5, 425 that calls him a praetorian prefect; it is not clearly stated if he was praetorian prefect of the East or of Illyricum, but the former is more probable.

== See also ==
- Aetia gens

== Sources ==
- Martindale, John R., ed. (1980). The Prosopography of the Later Roman Empire: Volume II, AD 395–527. Cambridge: Cambridge University Press. pp. 19–20. ISBN 0-521-20159-4.

Preceded by Ursus	Praefectus urbi of Constantinople (418?-)419(-?421)	Succeeded by Florentius
Preceded by Asclepiodotus	Praetorian prefect of the East; 425	Succeeded by Hierius (I)
