= Agricola (consul 421) =

West Roman state official

Agricola (full name possibly Julius Agricola; fl. 365–421) was a West Roman statesman who served twice as praetorian prefect and became consul for 421.

== Life ==
He was from Gaul Narbo. His familial relations are unclear: the names of Agricola's parents are unknown, as is the name of his wife, and the names of his children. He may have had a son named Nymphidius. He was the grandfather of Magnus, consul in 460. He was also a relative, perhaps even the father, of the emperor Avitus (r. 455–456).

He served twice as praetorian prefect. His first tenure was sometime before 418, but the exact circumscription is unknown; it was most probably in the Western half of the empire, however. The second time Agricola served as praetorian prefect of Gaul was in 418. He presided over the initial annual concilium of the Gauls. This assembly had been founded by a previous praetorian prefect, Petronius, but it had stopped meeting due to the revolt of Constantine III.

The last office Agricola is recorded holding is the consulship for 421, with Eustathius as the parallel officeholder in the East.

== Bibliography ==
- Martindale, John R., ed. (1980). The Prosopography of the Later Roman Empire: Volume II, AD 395–527. Cambridge: Cambridge University Press. ISBN 0-521-20159-4.

Political offices
Preceded by Theodosius Augustus IX; Constantius III	Roman consul 421 with Eustathius	Succeeded by Honorius Augustus XIII; Theodosius Augustus X
