= Eustathius (consul) =

East Roman state official

Flavius Eustathius (Greek: Εύστάθιος, fl. 415–422) was a politician and consul of the Eastern Roman Empire.

== Biography ==
In 415-416 he was quaestor sacri palatii; in this capacity he received a copy of a law (Codex Theodosianus i.8.1, "De officio quaestoris", 15 October 415) he had promoted.

Between 420 and 422 he held the high office of Praetorian prefect of the East, while in 421 he held the consulate.

== Bibliography ==
- Martindale, John R., ed. (1980). "Fl. Eustathius 12". The Prosopography of the Later Roman Empire: Volume II, AD 395–527. Cambridge: Cambridge University Press. p. 436. ISBN 0-521-20159-4.

Political offices
Preceded by Theodosius Augustus IX; Constantius III	Roman consul 421 with Agricola	Succeeded by Honorius Augustus XIII; Theodosius Augustus X
Preceded by Monaxius	Praetorian prefect of the East; 420–422	Succeeded by Asclepiodotus
