= Antiochus Chuzon =

Antiochus Chuzon (Greek: Άντίοχος; floruit 429–438), called "the Elder" to distinguish him from his nephew, was a high official of the Eastern Roman Empire, praetorian prefect of the East and consul, who was a key figure in the compilation of the Codex Theodosianus.

== Life ==
Born in Antioch, in 429 he was quaestor sacri palatii when Emperor Theodosius II (r. 402–450) appointed him member of the first commission that was to formulate the Codex Theodosianus (March 26).

Later he was appointed praetorian prefect of the East, an office he held between 430 and 431. During his tenure, he exchanged letters with Theodoret, organised with Nestorius his return to the East through Asia Minor and Pontus, and rebuilt the city walls of Antioch.

In 431 he was appointed consul by the Eastern court, with Anicius Auchenius Bassus as Western colleague.

In 435 he was appointed member of the second commission for the formulation of the Codex Theodosianus. When the Codex was issued in 438, Antiochus was listed among its formulators.

He died between 438 and 444.

== Notes ==
Preceded by Theodosius Augustus XIII, Placidus Valentinianus Augustus III	Consul of the Roman Empire; 431 with Anicius Auchenius Bassus	Succeeded by Flavius Aetius, Flavius Valerius
Preceded by Flavius Florentius	Praetorian prefect of the East; 430–431	Succeeded by Rufinus
