= List of urban prefects of Constantinople =

This is a list of urban prefects or eparchs of Constantinople. The Prefect or Eparch (in Greek: ὁ ἔπαρχος τῆς πόλεως) was one of the oldest and longest-lived offices of the East Roman (Byzantine) Empire, being created in 359 and surviving relatively unaltered until the Fourth Crusade. The Eparch was one of the most important officials of the Empire, and exercised full control over all aspects of the administration of Constantinople, the Byzantine Empire's capital. In the Palaiologan period (1261–1453) the title was still awarded, but the office was replaced by several kephalatikeuontes (sing. kephalatikeuon, κεφαλατικεύων, "headsman"), who each oversaw a district, effectively a separate village within the now much less populous capital.

== 4th century ==
Names and dates until 641 are taken from the Prosopography of the Later Roman Empire. Exact dates given are those on which the prefects are known to have held office, but not necessarily the days on which they started or ended their terms.

=== Proconsuls of Constantinople (until 359) ===
- 342: Alexander
- 342: Ulpius Limenius
- c. 343: Donatus
- before 351: Montius Magnus
- before 353: Strategius Musonianus
- 354: Anatolius
- 355 September 1: Iustinus
- 355/356: Photius
- 356 May 9: Araxius
- 358–359: Themistius

=== Prefects of Constantinople (from 359) ===
- 359 December 11–361: Honoratus
- 362–363: Domitius Modestus
- 364 March 27–April 11: Jovius
- 365: Caesarius
- 365–366: Phronimius
- 372 May 8–373 August 4: Clearchus (first term)
- 375–376 May 29: Vindaonius Magnus
- mid 4th century: Unknown
- 380 June 24–July 14: Restitutus
- 381 July 30–382 April 4: Pancratius
- 382?: Sophronius
- 382 June 22–384 early: Clearchus (second term)
- 384: Themistius
- 382/408: Palladius
- 385/387: Theodorus
- 386 Jan 30–June 29: Nebridius
- 386/387: Clementinus
- 388–392 June 25: Proculus
- 392 late: Aristaenetus
- 393 February 27–394 October 6: Aurelianus
- 394?: Honoratus
- 395 May 21: Theodotus
- 396 January 6–February 15: Claudius
- 396 April 29–397 September 26: Africanus
- 398 February 1: Romulianus
- 398 July 12–399 September 25: Severinus

== 5th century ==
- 400 May 8–402 March 22: Clearchus
- 403: Simplicius
- 404: Paianius
- 404 August 29–September 11: Studius
- 404 November 24–405 June 12: Optatus
- 404/408: Gemellus
- 406 May 19–October 27: Aemilianus
- 408 January 17–409 April 26: Monaxius
- 410 September 4–412 October 20: Anthemius Isidorus
- 413 March 21: Priscianus
- 415 September 4–416 September 30: Ursus
- (418?–)419 February 23–October 4(–421?): Aetius
- 422 November 6: Florentius
- 423 September 29–424 January 9: Severinus
- 424 December 20–425 February 27: Constantius
- 425 March 15–426 July 1: Theophilus
- 426 December 26: Cyrus of Panopolis
- 426/443: Neuthius
- 428 Jan 31–July 13: Proculus
- Early/mid 5th century: Bacchus
- Early/mid 5th century: Olympiodorus
- Early/mid 5th century: Unknown
- 432 June 11: Heliodorus
- 434 November 27–435 August 3: Leontius
- 439 March 23–441 August 18: Cyrus of Panopolis
- 441/450: Eutychianus
- early 448: Eutrechius
- before 451 October: Antiochus
- before 451 October: Anysius
- before 451 October (before 442?): Theodorus
- 450 December 18–452 July 18: Tatianus
- 459: Theodosius
- before 467: Dioscorus
- 467: Diapherentius
- c. 468/488: Heliodorus
- 474 March 16: Iustinianus
- 474/479: Adamantius
- 474/491: Iulianus
- 474/491: Sporacius
- 478: Epinicus
- 483 December 16: Constantinus
- 491: Iulianus
- c. 492: Secundinus
- 500: Helias

== 6th century ==
- 501: Constantinus
- 507–512: Plato (first term)
- early 6th century: Asterius (honorary?)
- early 6th century: Flavius Theodorus Petrus Demosthenes (honorary?)
- before 519: Theodorus (first term)
- 518/519: Theodorus (second term)
- 520: Theodorus (third term)
- (522?–)523: Theodotus
- 524 February 13–526 December 1: Theodorus (fourth term)
- early 6th century: Menas (honorary?)
- 527/565: Tribonianus
- 528: Victor
- 530/531: Eustathius
- 532: Eudaemon
- 532: Tryphon
- 536 March: Patricius
- before 539: Plato (second term)
- (536?–)537–541/542: Longinus
- 543 December: Gabrielius
- 547 May: Thomas
- 550: Ioannes Coccorobius
- before 553: Areobindus
- 556 May: Musonius
- 560 late–562 May/June: Gerontius
- 562 November–563 April: Procopius
- 563 April: Andreas
- before 565: Zemarchus (first term)
- 565 January: Addaeus
- 565: Zemarchus (second term)
- 5605–566: Iulianus
- c. 567: Domninus
- 565/578: Unknown
- 571: Unknown
- 580: Sebastianus
- 580: Iulianus
- after 582: Aristomachus

== 7th century ==
- 603: Leontius
- 605 or 607: Theopemptus
- 609: Unknown
- 609: Cosmas
- 610: Priscus
- 610?/612: Rogatus
- 612: Theodorus
- c. 610/620: Gennadius
- 610/630: Damianus
- 615/616: Leontius

== 8th century ==
- c. 713/714: Daniel of Sinope
- 766: Prokopios

== 9th century ==
- c. 850: Marianos
- 860: Niketas Ooryphas
- 862–866: Basil
- 866: Constantine Myares
- c. 869: Paul
- under Basil I: Constantine Kapnogenes
- under Leo VI: Marianos
- late 9th century: John
- under Leo VI: Philotheos
- turn of 9th/10th century: Michael

== 10th century ==
- ?–945: Theophilos Erotikos
- 945–?: Constantine the protospatharios
- Theodore Daphnopates

== 11th century ==
- c. 1081: Rhadenos

== 12th century ==
- c. 1106: Basil
- c. 1107: John Taronites
- c. 1147: John Taronites
- c. 1156: Andronikos Kamateros
- c. 1181: John Kamateros Doukas
- 1181/2: Theodore Pantechnes
- c. 1198/1199: Constantine Tornikes

== 13th century ==
Latin Occupation (1204–1261)

- under Michael VIII: Constantine Chadenos

== 14th century ==
- 1328–1330/31: Theodore Synadenos

== Sources ==
- Martindale, John R.; Jones, A. H. M.; Morris, John, eds. (1971). The Prosopography of the Later Roman Empire: Volume I, AD 260–395. Cambridge: Cambridge University Press. ISBN 0-521-07233-6.
- Martindale, John R., ed. (1980). The Prosopography of the Later Roman Empire: Volume II, AD 395–527. Cambridge: Cambridge University Press. ISBN 0-521-20159-4.
- Martindale, John R., ed. (1992). The Prosopography of the Later Roman Empire: Volume III, AD 527–641. Cambridge: Cambridge University Press. ISBN 0-521-20160-8.
