= Aristomachus (Egypt) =

Prefect of Constantinople
- In office During the reign of Maurice (582–602) – Approx. early 7th century

Curator domus Augustae (caretaker of the Empress’s household)
- In office Under Empress Constantina during Maurice’s reign – (before his exile)

Personal details
- Born: Nikiû (Egypt)
- Died: After being exiled to the island of Gaul after a conspiracy led by Leo the logothete
- Known for: Public works in Constantinople (aqueducts, bronze reservoir)

Aristomachus (Greek: Ἀριστόμαχος) was an Egyptian Byzantine official in Egypt. He was active in the reigns of Tiberius II Constantine (r. 574–582) and Maurice (r. 582–602). He eventually rose to become prefect of Constantinople and "curator domus Augustae" (caretaker of the household of the Augusta), but later fell out of favor and ended his life in exile. The main source about him is John of Nikiû.

== Biography ==
Aristomachus was a native Egyptian citizen of Nikiû, from where his father, 'prefect' Theodosius, also hailed. Theodosius reportedly advised the young Aristomachus to rest content with the wealth and rank available to him. But the young man was exceedingly ambitious. He reportedly established his own armed following.

He seems to have held a military command in Egypt, though his rank is unspecified. He was presumably appointed by Tiberius II Constantine. John reports on his conduct: "He built vessels by means of which he could visit all the cities of Egypt with pleasure and delight. And so he became proud and forced all the military officers to be subject to the emperor; for he had received the command in the reign of the emperor Tiberius. And by reason of this command he became more and more presumptuous, and made all the troops submit to his orders, and led a fearless life. And he posted cavalry in the city of Nikiu without any authorization of the emperor. And all the troops under his command were without means, and he seized all the houses of those who were richer than he, and he esteemed them of no account. And when men of high or low degree came to him from the emperor, he let them remain at the door and did not admit them for a long time."

But he is, sometime later, mentioned leading campaigns against the Nubians and the Moors. "And he vanquished the barbarians in the province of Nubia and Africa, who are named Mauritanians, and others named Marikos. He destroyed them and laid waste their country, and took their possessions as a booty and brought them all in chains by the river Gihon into the land of Egypt; for the engagement had taken place on the banks of the river." Gihon is an alternative name for the Blue Nile.

It is unclear what John terms acting without authorization. A possible interpretation is that Aristomachus' proper position was in Upper Egypt, close to Nubia, perhaps as the military governor of Thebaid, but then the man attempted to illegally extend his authority. Nikiu laid out of his jurisdiction. Complaints about him reached eventually reached Tiberius. He sent Andreas (Andrew) to arrest Aristomachus.

Aristomachus was summoned to Alexandria. "Aristomachus ... proceeded to the city of Alexandria with only a few attendants; for he was not aware of the treacherous device they had prepared against him. And when the patriarch and Andrew saw him, they were delighted, and got ready a light ship on the sea close at hand to the Church of St. Mark the Evangelist. Then they celebrated ... the festival of St. Mark the Evangelist. And at the close of the divine service, Andrew went forth accompanied by Aristomachus and walked towards the seashore. And thereupon Andrew made a signal to his attendants and to the soldiers to seize Aristomachus and to cast him into the vessel. And immediately they seized him, and, bearing him on their shoulders, cast him into the vessel, without his being aware (of the reason), and loosing thence they set sail to go to the emperor."

Aristomachus was transported to Constantinople, but the investigation of Tiberius found no fault with his conduct. He was returned to Egypt and allowed to resume his office. He later visited Maurice to dispel accusations against him. He brought the emperor many gifts and apparently became a favourite of his. Maurice made him prefect of Constantinople ("prefect of the imperial city"), while the empress Constantina created him curator domus Augustae (caretaker of the household of the Augusta). The text narrates "the empress Constantina appointed him controller of all her house and loaded him with honours, until he was second only in rank to the emperor, and he became a very great personage in the city of Byzantium".

He is credited with building aqueducts and reservoirs. "And he constructed aqueducts throughout all the city, for its inhabitants complained greatly of the want of water. And he had a reservoir of bronze made for them by a clever engineer, such as had never been made previously. And so the water flowed into the reservoir of bronze which had been appointed. And the city was thus delivered from disquiet through the abundant supply of water; and when a fire broke out in the city, they went to the reservoir and extinguished the fire. And all the people loved and respected him. And he was fond of constructing public works, and his deeds were noble."

He was at some point targeted by a conspiracy, which made him appear disloyal to his imperial patrons. The instigator of the plot is identified as Leo (Leon) the logothete. They reportedly first used an astrologer to publish a prediction "of a revolt against the emperor" and "the assassination of the emperor". They then warned Constantina about said prediction and the supposed ambitions of Aristomachus. She brought the tale to Maurice. "And he imagined that Aristomachus intended to slay him and take his wife. And the emperor became hostile forthwith to Aristomachus, and he robbed him of every hope, and exposed him to numerous humiliations, and sent him in exile to the island of Gaul where he had to remain till he died."

The location of his exile is not recorded elsewhere.

== Sources ==
- Charles, Robert H. (2007) [1916]. The Chronicle of John, Bishop of Nikiu: Translated from Zotenberg's Ethiopic Text. Merchantville, NJ: Evolution Publishing. ISBN 9781889758879.
- Martindale, John R.; Jones, A.H.M.; Morris, John (1992), The Prosopography of the Later Roman Empire - Volume III, AD 527–641, Cambridge University Press, ISBN 0-521-20160-8
- Ostrogorsky, George (1956). History of the Byzantine State. Oxford: Basil Blackwell.
