= Domitius Modestus =

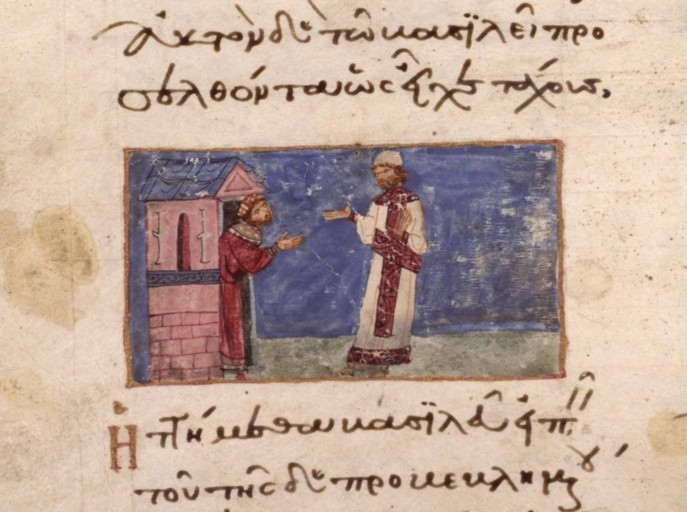
Representation of Emperor Valens receiving the answer of the bishop Basil of Caesarea from Domitius Modestus

Domitius Modestus (Greek: Δομίτιος Μοδέστος; floruit 358–377) was a politician of the Roman Empire. He held appointments under the emperors Constantius II, Julian, and Valens, and was consul in 372. Previously a pagan, he converted to Arianism under Valens, and was sent by Valens to mediate between the Arian and Nicene factions with Basil of Caesarea.

== Life ==
Modestus was comes Orientis from 358 to 362, succeeding to Nebridius and serving under the Emperors Constantius II and Julian. In 359 he was the president of a commission at Scythopolis, and in this office he judged with cruelty the defendants.

While he was in Antioch, Julian appointed Modestus as praefectus urbi of Constantinople, an office he held from 362 to 363.

Under Emperor Valens he was Praetorian prefect of the East (369-377) and consul in 372. During his office as Praetorian prefect he completed the building of the Cisterna Modestiaca (a cistern identified with Sarrâdshchane), whose building was begun by the architect Helpidius in 363, while Modestus was praefectus urbi.

In 371, he was appointed president of a commission that was to judge some high officers who had been accused of practicing magic, in particular of having consulted a soothsayer to learn the name of the successor of Emperor Valens. Ammianus Marcellinus and Gregory of Nazianzus accused him of base flattery towards the emperor, due to him being afraid for the succession and wanting to preserve his own power. Modestus acted very cruelly, torturing innocent people, thus extorting confessions from them. His consulate, the following year, was probably a reward for his handling of the process.

Despite the fact that he was strongly connected with the pagan officers and had been a pagan under the pagan Emperor Julian, under Valens he converted to Arianism, the Emperor's religion. Valens sent Modestus to meet the Nicene bishop Basil of Caesarea, to mediate between the two opposing Christian faiths, but Basil refused. Modestus was then ordered by Valens to use violence against the bishop, but he did not.

He is the addressee of 37 letters by Libanius.

== Sources ==
- Burns, Paul (ed.), Butler's Lives of the Saints: New Full Edition January. The Liturgical Press. ISBN 0-8146-2377-8.
- Martindale, John R.; Jones, A. H. M.; Morris, John, eds. (1971). The Prosopography of the Later Roman Empire: Volume I, AD 260–395. Cambridge: Cambridge University Press. ISBN 0-521-07233-6.

Preceded by Gratian Augustus II; Sex. Claudius Petronius Probus	Roman consul 372 with Arinthaeus	Succeeded by Valentinian Augustus IV; Valens Augustus IV
Preceded by Salutius	Praetorian prefect of the East; 369–377	Succeeded by Aburgius
Preceded by Honoratus	Urban prefect of Constantinople; 362–363	Succeeded by Jovius
Preceded by Nebridius	Comes Orientis; 358–362	Succeeded by Iulianus
