= Asclepiodotus (consul 423) =

Flavius Asclepiodotus or Asclepiades (Greek: Ασκληπιόδοτος; fl. 423–425) was a politician of the Eastern Roman Empire

Asclepiodotus was the brother-in-law of the sophist Leontius, and thus the uncle of Athenais, who in 421 married the Emperor Theodosius II taking the name of Aelia Eudocia. Eudocia favoured her family, exercising her influence over her husband to advance Asclepiodotus' career.

In 422, Asclepiodotus was comes sacrarum largitionum, while between 14 February 423 (the year in which Eudocia was appointed Augusta) to 1 February 425 he was Praetorian prefect of the East, and Consul in 423.

Evagrius Scholasticus reports an instance in which, after a wave of anti-Jewish violence in Antioch, Asclepiodotus issued a decree that any property stolen from Jews should be returned to them, and any synagogues seized and converted to churches should be restored. When Simeon Stylites heard of this, he wrote a letter to Emperor Theodosius which is recorded in the Syriac Life of Simeon:

Because in the pride of your heart you have forgotten the Lord your God, who gave you the crown of majesty and the royal throne, and have become a friend and comrade and abettor of the unbelieving Jews; know that of a sudden the righteous judgment of God will overtake you and all those 'who are of one mind with you in this matter. Then you will lift up your hands to heaven, and say in your distress, Of a truth because I dealt falsely with the Lord God this punishment has come upon me.

Simeon's charge against Asclepiodotus was no doubt reinforced by the fact that his family was pagan, although Athenais had to convert to Christianity before marriage. When Theodosius received it, he revoked the edict, fired Asclepiodotus and sent a humble reply to Simeon. Theodoret, who wrote a biography of Simeon, does not explicitly mention this incident, although he praises Simeon for "defeating the insolence of the Jews". Theodor Nöldeke doubted its historicity.

== Bibliography ==
- Jones, Arnold Hugh Martin, John Robert Martindale, John Morris, "Asclepiodotus 1", The Prosopography of the Later Roman Empire, volume 1, Cambridge University Press, 1992, ISBN 0-521-07233-6, p. 160.

Preceded by Honorius Augustus XIII; Theodosius Augustus X	Roman consul 423 with Avitus Marinianus	Succeeded by Castinus; Victor
Preceded by Eustathius	Praetorian prefect of the East; 423–425	Succeeded by Aetius
