= Anthemius Isidorus =

Egyptian politician of the Eastern Roman Empire

Flavius Anthemius Isidorus (Greek: Άνθέμιος Ίσίδωρος; fl. 410–436) was an Egyptian politician of the Eastern Roman Empire, the maternal uncle of the Western emperor Anthemius.

== Biography ==
A native of Egypt, Isidorus, the name by which he is known in almost all sources, was the son of Anthemius, the praetorian prefect of the East in 405–414, consul of 405 and grandfather of Emperor Anthemius. Isidorus was the Emperor's maternal uncle. Anthemius Isidorus Theofilus, governor (praeses) of Arcadia Aegypti in 434, was probably his son.

At an indefinite period between 405 and 410, he was Proconsul of Asia, as attested by inscriptions found in Hypaepa in Lydia. Between 4 September 410 and 29 October 412 he was praefectus urbi of Constantinople; in that capacity he received some laws preserved in the Theodosian Code and the Code of Justinian, which included one ordering him to complete the Baths of Honorius and build a portico in front of the structure. He undoubtedly obtained both offices due to the influence of his father, who, as Praetorian prefect of the East, had the real power.

After serving as praetorian prefect of Illyricum (22 April to 10 October 424), Isodorus himself was appointed to the powerful post of praetorian prefect of the East (29 January 435-4 August 436). He provided supplies to the city of Ephesus during a famine. The city thanked him in an inscription. While praetorian prefect, he received two letters from Isidore of Pelusium. In 436 Isidorius was appointed consul prior, along with Senator.

Isidorus died before 446/447.

== Bibliography ==
- Martindale, John R., ed. (1980). "Fl. Anthemius Isidorus 9". The Prosopography of the Later Roman Empire: Volume II, AD 395–527. Cambridge: Cambridge University Press. pp. 631–633. ISBN 0-521-20159-4.

Preceded by Theodosius Augustus XV; Valentinian Augustus IV	Roman consul 436 with Senator	Succeeded by Aetius II; Sigisvultus
Preceded by Taurus	Praetorian prefect of the East; 435–436	Succeeded by Darius
Preceded by Monaxius	Urban prefect of Constantinople; 410–412	Succeeded by Priscianus
