= Helpidius (praetorian prefect) =

Helpidius was the praetorian prefect of the East during the years 360 and 361.

== Biography ==
Helpidius was a native of Paphlagonia. According to Libanius, Helpidius was of low birth and not member of the provincial aristocracy. However, this is questionable as Helpidius would have hardly been able to afford to secure a post in the higher administration. Around 350, he seems to have registered as citizen in Constantinople in order to join the new imperial senate.

At some time before 356, Helpidius and his family visited the hermits Anthony the Great and Hilarion in Egypt and Gaza, respectively. According to Jerome, Hilarion was able to heal the children of Helpidius from fever.

In 360, he succeeded Flavius Hermogenes as Preatorian prefect of the East and is attested in office on 4 February 360. He was dismissed by Julian at the end of 361. His successor Secundus was in office by December 361. Ammianus describes Helpidius as humane and a good administrator.

Helpidius is also mentioned in the oratio "To Polycles" of Libanius in which he accuses Helpidius of having contrived the lie that Julian had his wife Helena poisoned by a court doctor. The oratio consists in an attempt to defend the memory of Julian while discrediting his accusers Polycles and Helpidius.

== Family ==
Helpidius was married to Aristaenete and had three children. Their daughter Priscilla married Bassianus in 363, the son of the Antiochean praetorian prefect Thalassius, who owned large landholdings in Antioch, Tyre and the province of Euphratensis. His grandson was Aristaenetus.

Preceded by Flavius Hermogenes	Praetorian prefect of the East; 430–431	Succeeded by Saturninius Secundus Salutius
