= Darius (praetorian prefect) =

Politician of the Eastern Roman Empire 5th Century AD

Darius (Greek: Δαρείος; floruit 425–437) was a politician of the Eastern Roman Empire.

Darius was a Praetorian prefect of the East. He is attested in office between 28 August 436, when the law preserved in Codex Theodosianus XI 1.37^{a} was addressed to him, to 16 March 437, the day in which another law, preserved in Codex Theodosianus VI 23.4^{a}, was addressed to him.

He might have been in office until October 437; in that case, he was in Constantinople and received a copy of the not-yet published Codex Theodosianus.

Darius is to be identified with the Praetorian prefect "Damarius", whose wife Aeliana had a vision in 425, in Constantinople.

Darius may be the envoy who negotiated on behalf of Placidia with Bonifatius.

== Sources ==
- Martindale, John R., ed. (1980). "Darius 3". The Prosopography of the Later Roman Empire: Volume II, AD 395–527. Cambridge: Cambridge University Press. p. 348. ISBN 0-521-20159-4.
- Mathisen, Ralph W. (1999), Sigisvult the Patrician, Maximinus the Arian and political strategems in het Western Roman Empire c. 425-40, pag 182

Preceded by Flavius Anthemius Isidorus	Praetorian prefect of the East; 436–437	Succeeded by Flavius Florentius (II)
