= Hierius (consul) =

Flavius Hierius (Greek: Ίέριος; floruit 425–432) was a politician of the Eastern Roman Empire.

== Life ==
Hierius was Praetorian prefect of the East a first time from 425 to 428, then a second time in 432. In 427, he also held the consulate, with Ardabur as a colleague, both chosen by the Eastern court. In 427 he also restored and dedicated the Baths of Constantine (also called "of Theodosius").

== Sources ==
- Martindale, John R., ed. (1980). "Hierius 2". The Prosopography of the Later Roman Empire: Volume II, AD 395–527. Cambridge: Cambridge University Press. p. 557. ISBN 0-521-20159-4.

Preceded by Theodosius Augustus XII, Placidus Valentinianus Augustus II	Consul of the Roman Empire; 427 with Flavius Ardabur	Succeeded by Flavius Felix, Flavius Taurus
Preceded by Aetius	Praetorian prefect of the East; 425-428	Succeeded by Florentius (I)
Preceded by Rufinus	Praetorian prefect of the East; 432	Succeeded by Taurus (I)
