= Julius Bassus =

1st century Roman orator

Julius Bassus was a rhetorician and orator of ancient Rome. He lived around the late 1st century BCE and early 1st century CE.

This Bassus is frequently mentioned by Seneca the Elder in his Controversiae, and seems to be the same person as the Junius Bassus who was called the "white ass" (asinus albus) when the 1st-century rhetorician Quintilian was a boy, and who was distinguished by his mordant, insulting, even abusive wit. Some scholars disagree whether these two were the same person.

This person also may be the same as the "Bassus" mentioned briefly as a friend of the Latin poet Ovid.

His harrowing portrayal of the suffering of a prisoner bound in chains over a long time span, quoted by Seneca, suggests he once may have been so imprisoned, or knew closely someone who was.
