= Cyrus of Panopolis =

Roman politician, poet and philosopher

Flavius Taurus Seleucus Cyrus (fl. 426–441), better known as Cyrus of Panopolis (Greek: Κῦρος ὁ Πανοπολίτης) from his birthplace of Panopolis in Egypt, was a senior East Roman official, epic poet, philosopher and a lover of Greek arts. He lived in Constantinople during the reign of Emperor Theodosius II (ruled 402–450).

== Life ==
As an author of eulogies, epigrams and epic poetry, Cyrus enjoyed the patronage of Empress Aelia Eudocia. After serving through a series of bureaucratic positions in the palace, in circa 426, Cyrus assumed the post of urban prefect of Constantinople for the first time. His powers were further expanded when he was also appointed as praetorian prefect of the East in November, making him the second most powerful man in the Empire after Emperor Theodosius II himself. Cyrus was the first urban prefect to abolish Latin as the language of administration, and issued his edicts in Greek. His activities for the improvement and embellishment of Constantinople were considerable: he introduced street lighting, restored several buildings, including the city walls, and erected a church to the Theotokos in a district that later bore his name. His contribution was also important to the establishment of the university of Constantinople. His works earned him great popularity with the people: according to the chronicler Zonaras, on seeing the city walls repaired in record speed, they exclaimed "Constantine [the Great] built them, Cyrus restored them." This comparison disquieted the Emperor, who dismissed Cyrus from all his offices in August 441.

Cyrus was accused of pagan sympathies and exiled to Phrygia, where he entered the clergy, becoming bishop of Cotyaeum in 443. The choice of his place of exile was not accidental: the people of Cotyaeum had already assassinated four of their previous bishops. He returned to secular life after Theodosius' death in 450, and returned to Constantinople. He was apparently pardoned and his fortune returned to him, allowing him to give much of it to charities until his death in the reign of Emperor Leo. In that time (ca. 460) Cyrus became a friend of Daniel the Stylite, after he freed his younger daughter Alexandria of an evil spirit. The saint repeated the miracle a few years later with Cyrus' elder daughter.

== Bibliography ==
- Dzielska, Maria, Hypatia of Alexandria, Harvard University Press, 1995, ISBN 0-674-43776-4, p. 31.
- Grillmeier, Aloys (1986), Christ in Christian Tradition: from the Council of Chalcedon, Louisville: Westminster John Knox Press, pp. 90–91, ISBN 0-664-22160-2
- Martindale, John R., ed. (1980). The Prosopography of the Later Roman Empire: Volume II, AD 395–527. Cambridge: Cambridge University Press. ISBN 0-521-20159-4.
- Van der Horst, Pieter W (2012). "Cyrus: A Forgotten Poet". Greece & Rome. 59 (2): 193–201. doi:10.1017/S0017383512000071.

Preceded by Valentinian Augustus V Anatolius	Roman consul 441	Succeeded by Dioscorus; Eudoxius
Preceded by Florentius II	Praetorian prefect of the East; 439–441	Succeeded by Thomas
