= Lucius Turranius Venustus Gratianus =

Lucius Turranius Venustus Gratianus was a Roman Praetor c. 300. He was the son of Lucius Turranius Gratianus (c. 240 - after 291) and wife Venusta, and possibly the paternal grandson of Lucius Turranius Gratianus Crispinus Lucilianus (born 215).

He married and was the possibly the father of Lucius Turranius Honoratus (born c. 300), who married Aurelia Jovina and possibly had Turrenia Honorata (or Turrania) (born c. 325), married before 345 to Anicius Auchenius Bassus (praefectus urbi of Rome in 382–383), and had issue.

== Sources ==
- Christian Settipani, Les Ancêtres de Charlemagne (France: Éditions Christian, 1989).
- Christian Settipani, Continuite Gentilice et Continuite Familiale Dans Les Familles Senatoriales Romaines, A L'Epoque Imperiale, Mythe et Realite. Linacre, UK: Prosopographica et Genealogica, 2000. ILL. NYPL ASY (Rome) 03-983.
- Christian Settipani, Continuité gentilice et continuité familiale dans les familles sénatoriales romaines à l’époque impériale: mythe et réalité, Prosopographica et Genealogica vol. 2 (Linacre College, Oxford, 2000), Addenda et Corrigenda
