= Ardabur (consul 427) =

Roman army officer

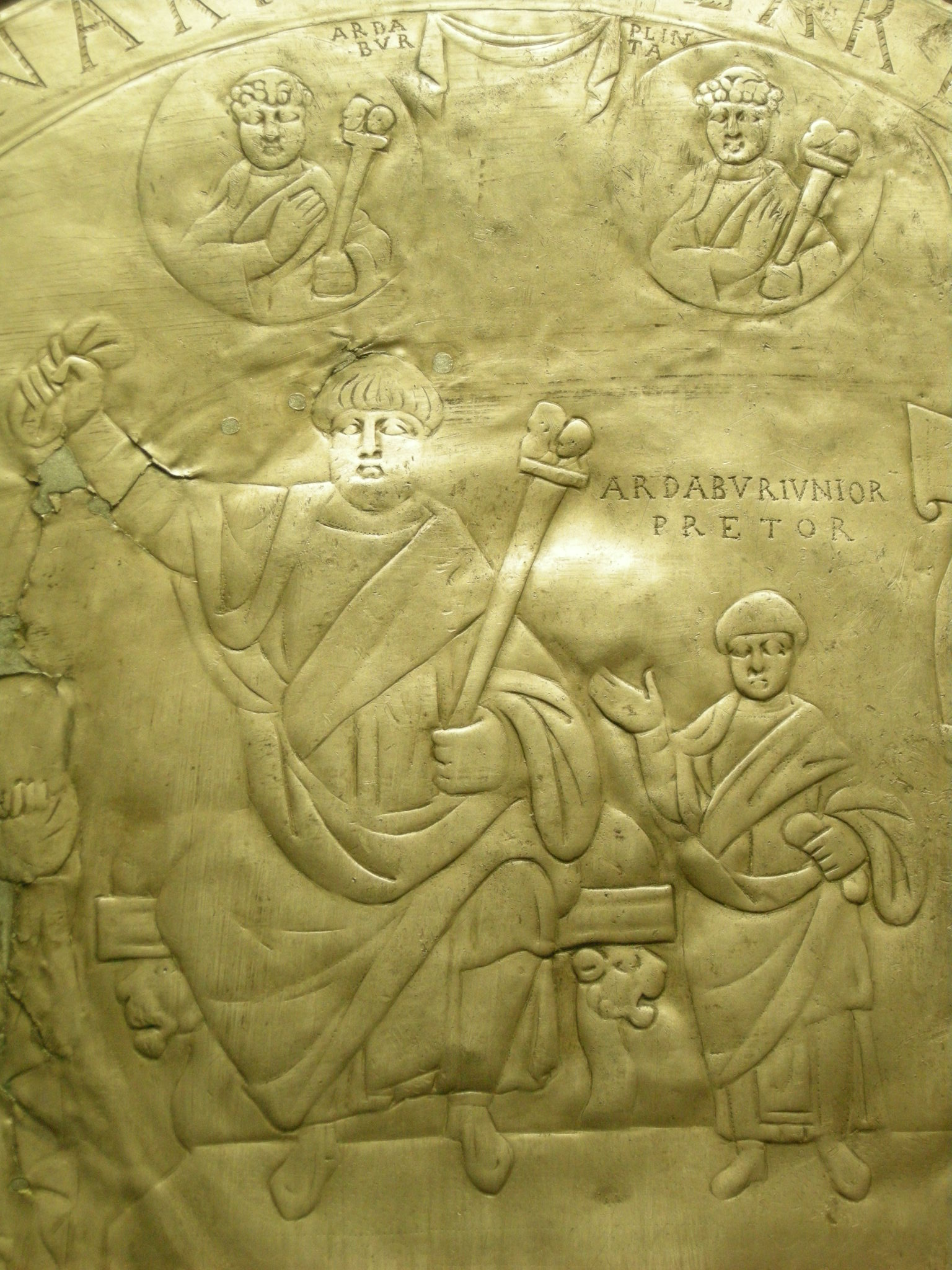
A detail of the Missorium of Aspar. Over Aspar and his son Ardabur, there are two imagines clipeatae depicting Ardabur the Elder (left) and Plinta.

Ardabur (Greek: Ἀρδαβούρ) served as magister militum in the East Roman army in the 420s, under Theodosius II. He was of Alanic origin.

During the Roman-Persian War of 421–422, he ravaged Arzanene and besieged Nisibis. After the war ended, Ardabur was promoted to the rank of magister militum praesentalis.

In 424, Ardabur and his son Aspar were sent on a campaign to Italy to overthrow the usurper Joannes. Ardabur was captured but his son managed to save him.

After his return to Constantinople, he was made consul for the year 427.

Ardabur should be distinguished from his grandson of the same name, who was consul twenty years later.

== Sources ==
- Lee, Doug (2018). "Ardabur". In Nicholson, Oliver (ed.). The Oxford Dictionary of Late Antiquity. Oxford: Oxford University Press. ISBN 978-0-19-866277-8.
- Croke, Brian (2018). "Aspar". In Nicholson, Oliver (ed.). The Oxford Dictionary of Late Antiquity. Oxford: Oxford University Press. ISBN 978-0-19-866277-8.
- Haarer, Fiona (2018). "Ardabur". In Nicholson, Oliver (ed.). The Oxford Dictionary of Late Antiquity. Oxford: Oxford University Press. ISBN 978-0-19-866277-8.

Preceded by Theodosius II; Valentinian III	Roman consul 427; With: Hierius	Succeeded by Felix; Taurus
