= Cesellius Bassus =

1st century Roman charlatan

Cesellius Bassus was an equestrian of ancient Rome, a Carthaginian by birth, who lived in the 1st century CE, and is notable for having persuaded the emperor Nero with his own delusional claims.

Several historians tell an anecdote in which Bassus, on the strength of a dream he'd had, and after having bribed his way into an audience, promised the Roman emperor Nero he could divine the location of an immense hoard of gold, which had been buried by the legendary queen Dido when she fled from Tyre to Africa to establish the city of Carthage, a treasure which was conveniently located on land that Bassus owned. In some of these accounts he is described as "crazy" or "suffering from hallucinations", or, more charitably, possessed of a "wild and irregular cast of mind".

Nero gave credence to Bassus's tale, and dispatched an expedition led by Bassus -- a flotilla of warships, and a huge number of laborers for the excavation -- to dig up and carry the treasures back to Rome. Bassus, after digging about in every direction, was unable to find them. By some accounts he committed suicide in despair in 66 CE, but in others he was returned to Rome in chains to take accountability for his tale, possibly even being released afterwards.

Given this story occurs at the very end of the reign of Nero, it is likely that there was some element of his critics wanting to underscore his decline.
