= Theodosius II =

Eastern Roman emperor from 402 to 450

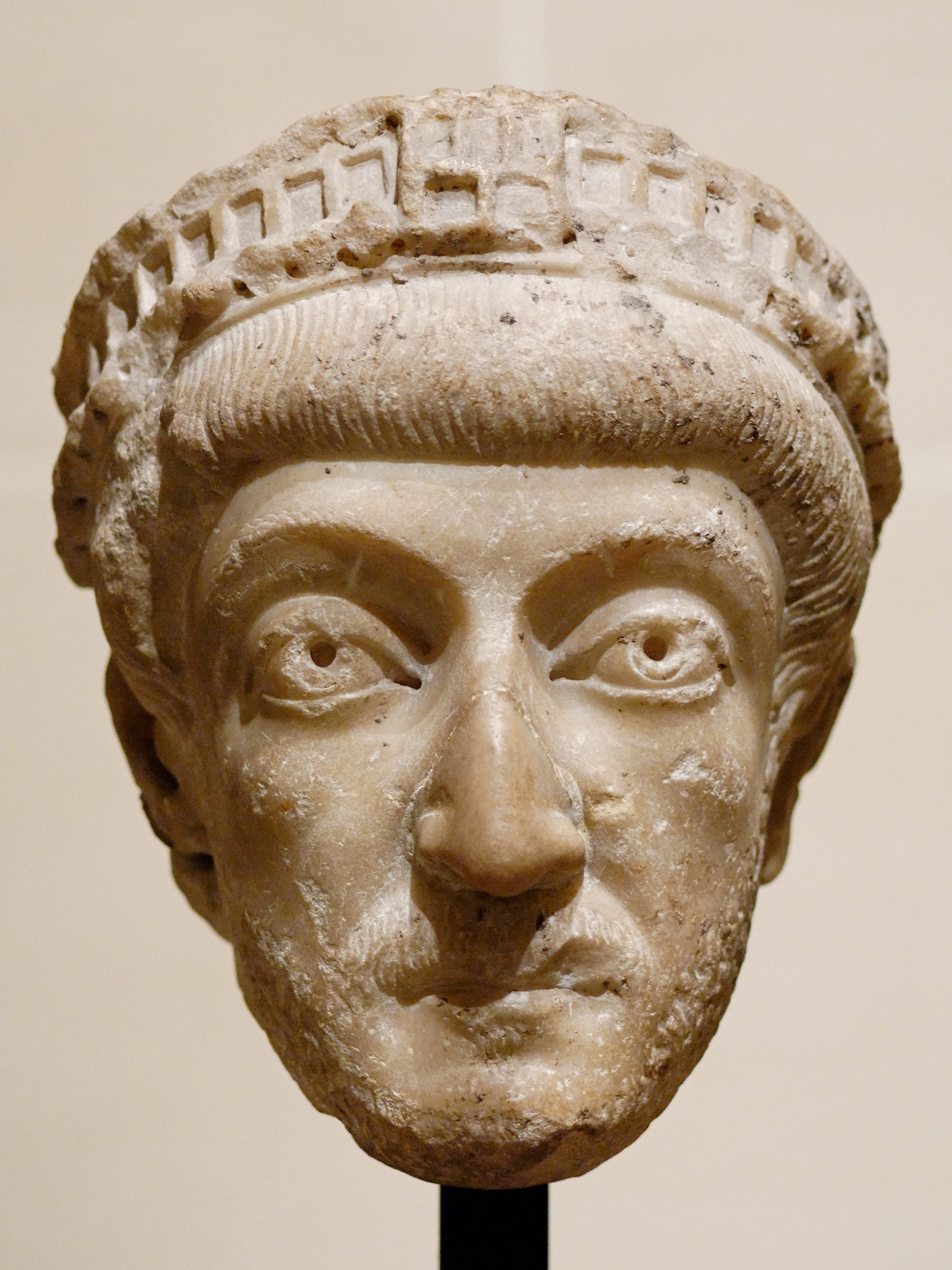
- Bust of Theodosius II in the Louvre

Roman emperor of the East
- Reign: 10 January 402 – 28 July 450 (senior from 1 May 408)
- Predecessor: Arcadius
- Successor: Marcian
- Western emperors: Honorius (402–423): Attalus (Rome, 409–410); Constantine III (Gaul, 409–411); Constans II (Gaul, 409–411); Constantius III (West, 421); Joannes (423–425); Valentinian III (425–455)
- Born: 10 April 401
- Died: 28 July 450 (aged 49)
- Burial: Church of the Holy Apostles, Constantinople
- Spouse: Aelia Eudocia
- Issue: Licinia Eudoxia; Flaccilla; Arcadius (possibly)
Regnal name
- Latin: Imperator Caesar Flavius Theodosius Augustus; Ancient Greek: Αὐτοκράτωρ καῖσαρ Φλάβιος Θεοδόσιος αὐγουστος
- Dynasty: Theodosian
- Father: Arcadius
- Mother: Aelia Eudoxia
- Religion: Nicene Christianity

Saint Theodosius II

Right-Believing, Emperor of the Roman Empire
- Venerated in: Eastern Orthodox Church; Oriental Orthodox Church
- Feast: 29 July

Theodosius II (Latin: Theodosius, Ancient Greek: Θεοδόσιος Theodosios; 10 April 401 – 28 July 450), called "the Calligrapher", (Note: The nickname Καλλιγράφος (Latin: Calligraphus) appears in the chronicles of George the Monk (c. 850, Chronicon II, 604), Michael Glykas (c. 1150, Annales IV, 261), and George Kodinos (c. 1500, Chronographia, 76).) was Roman emperor from 402 to 450. He was proclaimed Augustus as an infant and ruled as the Eastern Empire's sole emperor after the death of his father Arcadius in 408. His reign was marked by the promulgation of the Theodosian law code, the construction of the Theodosian walls of Constantinople, and the founding of the oldest university in the world, University of Constantinople (in 425). He also presided over the outbreak of two great Christological controversies, Nestorianism and Eutychianism.

== Early life ==
Theodosius was born on 10 April 401 as the only son of Emperor Arcadius and his wife Aelia Eudoxia. On 10 January 402, at the age of 9 months, he was proclaimed co-augustus by his father, thus becoming the youngest to bear the imperial title up to that point. On 1 May 408, his father died and the seven-year-old boy became the sole emperor of the Eastern half of the Roman Empire.

== Reign ==
=== Early reign ===
The government was at first administered by the praetorian prefect Anthemius, under whose supervision the Theodosian walls of Constantinople were constructed.

According to the sixth-century historian Procopius and eight-century chronicler Theophanes the Confessor, the Sasanian king Yazdegerd I (399–420) was appointed by Arcadius as the guardian of Theodosius, whom Yazdegerd treated as his own child, sending a tutor to raise him and warning that enmity toward him would be taken as enmity toward Persia. Though this story is assumed to be inconclusive, Antiochus, a eunuch of Persian origin, became a tutor and an influence on Theodosius. He also became praepositus sacri cubiculi later but Theodosius dismissed him when he reached his adulthood.

In 414, Theodosius's older sister Pulcheria vowed perpetual virginity along with her sisters. She was proclaimed augusta, and acted as a guardian of her brother. The guardianship ended when he reached his majority, but it is assumed that his sister continued to exert some influence during his reign.

In June 421, Theodosius married Aelia Eudocia, a woman of Athenian origin. The two had a daughter named Licinia Eudoxia, another named Flaccilla, and possibly a son called Arcadius.

In 423, the Western Emperor Honorius, Theodosius's uncle, died and the primicerius notariorum Joannes was proclaimed emperor. Honorius's sister Galla Placidia and her young son Valentinian, who had earlier fled to Constantinople to escape Honorius's hostility, sought Eastern assistance to claim the throne for Valentinian, and after some deliberation in 424 Theodosius opened the war against Joannes. On 23 October 425, Valentinian III was installed as emperor of the West with the assistance of the magister officiorum Helion, with his mother taking an influential role. To strengthen the ties between the two parts of the empire, Theodosius's daughter Licinia Eudoxia was betrothed to Valentinian. She married Valentinian III later on 29 October 437, and became empress of the western portion of the empire.

=== University and Law Code ===
In 425, Theodosius founded the oldest university in the world, the University of Constantinople with 31 chairs (15 in Latin and 16 in Greek). Among the subjects were law, philosophy, medicine, arithmetic, geometry, astronomy, music and rhetoric. It is likely that his wife Eudocia encouraged him in this matter and was behind the establishment of the university; she had been born in Athens, where the Neoplatonic School of Athens was the last great center for pagan, classical learning. Eudocia was known for her great intellect.

In 429, Theodosius appointed a commission to collect all of the laws since the reign of Constantine I, and create a fully formalized system of law. This plan was left unfinished, but the work of a second commission that met in Constantinople, assigned to collect all of the general legislations and bring them up to date, was completed; their collection was published as the Codex Theodosianus in 438. The law code of Theodosius II, summarizing edicts promulgated since Constantine, formed a basis for the law code of Emperor Justinian I, the Corpus Juris Civilis, in the following century.

=== Banishment of Eudocia ===
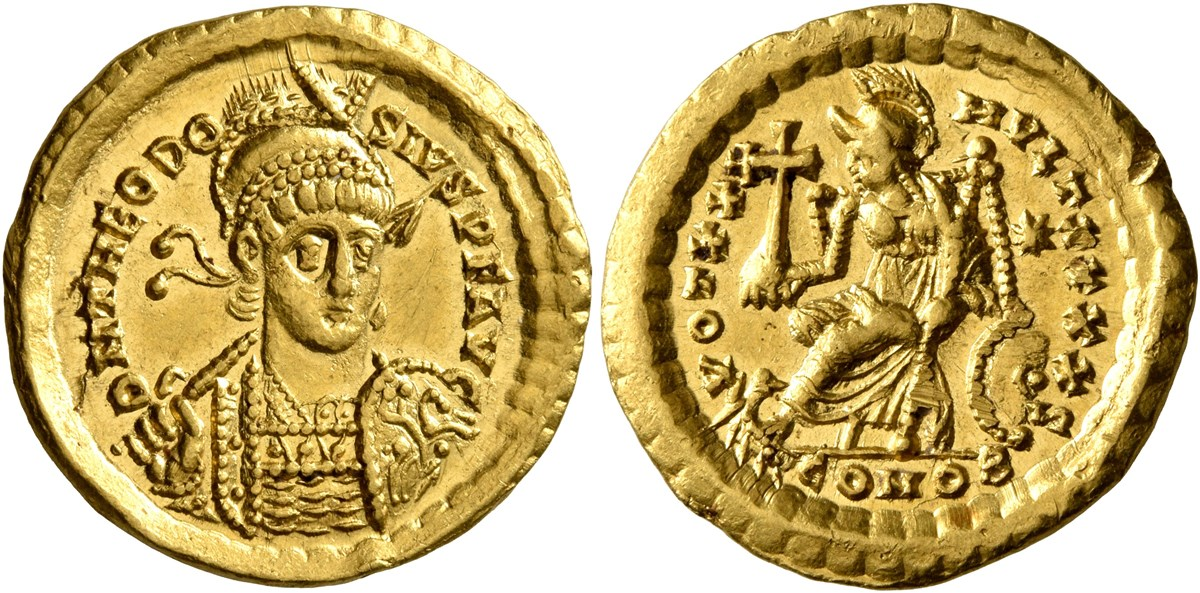
Solidus of Theodosius, minted in Constantinople c. 435

Eudocia reached the height of her influence with the emperor from 439 to 441, a period in which, according to some sources, the emperor's sister Pulcheria was sidelined in favor of his wife. However, a separation ultimately occurred between the imperial couple between 441 and 444, with Eudocia's establishment in Jerusalem where she favored monastic Monophysitism. The reasons for her banishment are related by two conflicting tales.

The sixth-century historian John Malalas explains Eudocia's departure in a legend involving a certain Phrygian apple. Malalas wrote in his Chronicle that one day, the emperor was on his way to church when a man presented the emperor with an "apple huge beyond any exaggeration." The emperor thanked the man with 150 solidi, and promptly sent the apple to his wife as a present. Eudocia decided to give the apple to Paulinus, a friend of both her and the emperor. Paulinus, unknowing of where Eudocia had gotten the apple, thought it was fit for only the emperor, and gave it to him. Theodosius was suspicious, and asked Eudocia what she had done with the apple. "I ate it," she replied, and then Theodosius asked her to confirm her answer with an oath, which she did. Theodosius then presented her with the enormous apple. The emperor was enraged and suspected an affair between Eudocia and Paulinus; he had his lifelong friend Paulinus executed, and Eudocia asked to be exiled to Jerusalem.

But the contemporary historian Priscus and a sixth-century chronicler Marcellinus Comes relate a different story. In this version, Eudocia murdered the comes domesticorum Saturninus for killing her close associates on Theodosius's orders. In response, the emperor stripped her of her attendants and she went on to settle in Jerusalem.

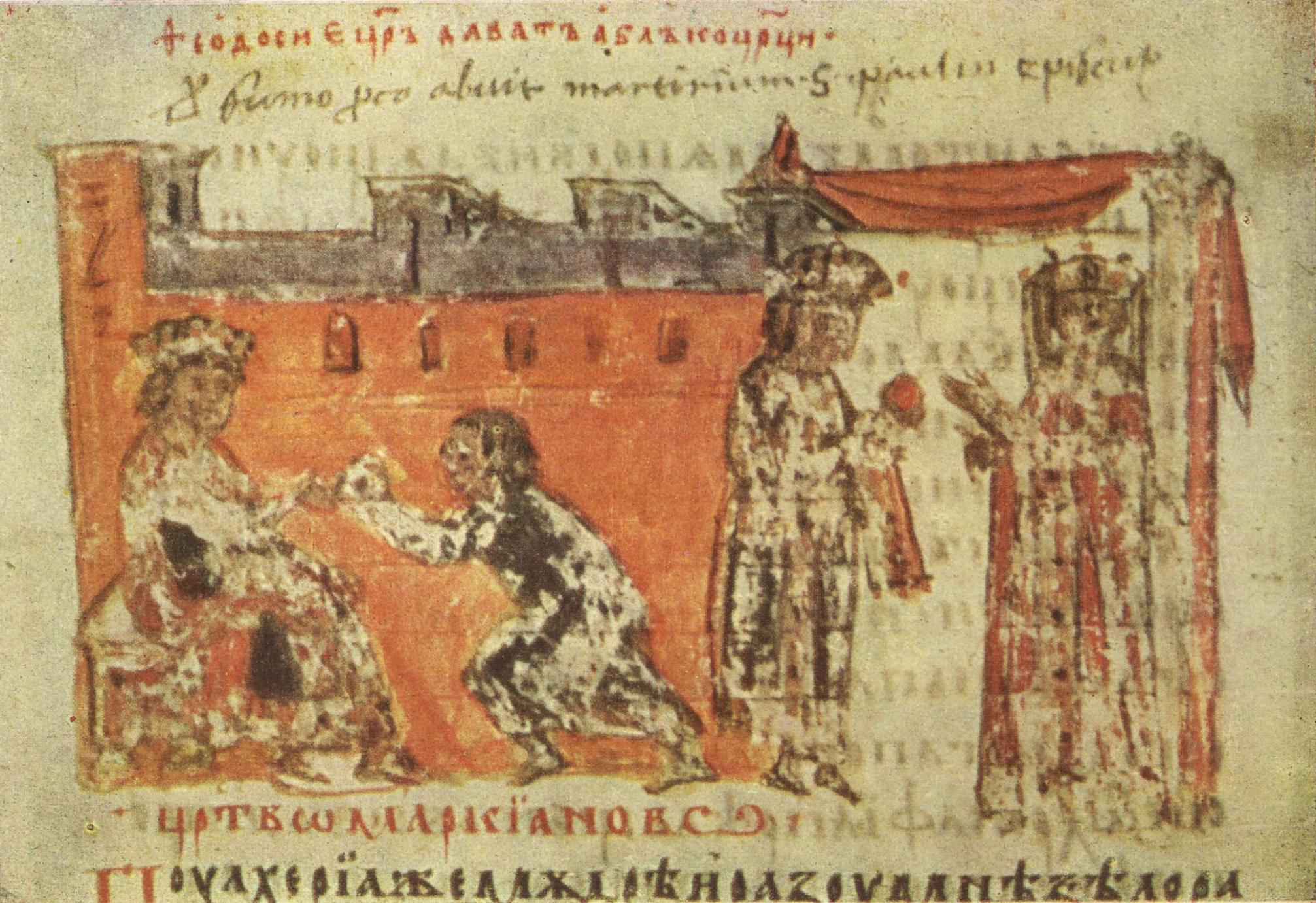
Theodosius receives the Phrygian Apple and inquisits Eudocia about it. A scene from the 14th century Manasses Chronicle.

=== Wars with the Huns, Vandals, and Persians ===
The situation between the Romans and the Sassanids deteriorated in 420 due to the Persian persecution of Christians, and the Eastern empire declared war against the Sasanian empire (421–422); the war ended in an indecisive stalemate, when the Romans were forced to accept peace as the Huns menaced Constantinople. Peace was arranged in 422 without changes to the status quo. The later wars of Theodosius were generally less successful.

The Eastern Empire was plagued by raids by the Huns. Early in Theodosius II's reign Romans used internal Hun discord to overcome Uldin's invasion of the Balkans. The Romans strengthened their fortifications and in 424 agreed to pay 350 pounds of gold to encourage the Huns to remain at peace with the Romans. In 439 with the rise of Attila and Bleda to unify the Huns, the payment was doubled to 700 pounds.

Theodosius became engaged with the affairs of the West after installing Valentinian III as his Western counterpart. When Roman Africa fell to the Vandals in 439, Theodosius sent forces to Sicily, intending to launch an attack on the Vandals at Carthage. In 441 seeing the borders without significant forces, the Huns attacked the Balkans, pushing as far as Naissus (Niš) and Serdica (Sofia) and sacking nearly all the major cities on the middle Danube. This led to the expeditionary force in Sicily being recalled in 442. In 447 Huns defeated the Roman armies in Utus and Chersonese, and went through the Balkans, destroying among others the city of Serdica and reaching Athyra (Büyükçekmece) on the outskirts of Constantinople. In 443 or 447, Anatolius negotiated a peace agreement; the Huns withdrew in exchange for humiliating concessions, including an annual tribute of 2,100 Roman pounds (c. 687 kg) of gold and an additional payment of 6,000 pounds. In 449, an Eastern Roman attempt to assassinate Attila failed, however the relations between the two did not deteriorate further.

=== Theological disputes ===
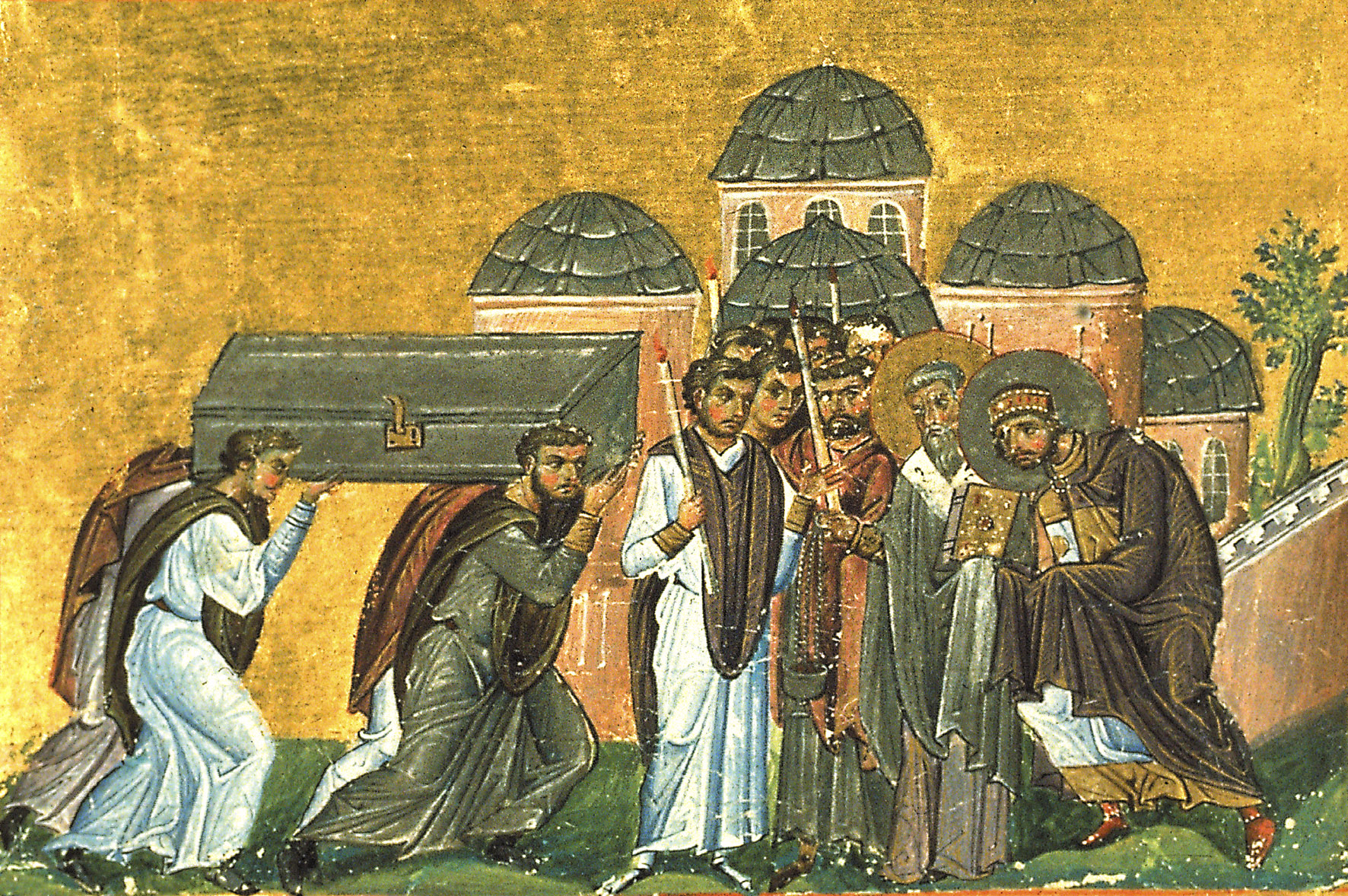
Theodosius welcomes the relics of John Chrysostom; miniature from the early 11th century

Theodosius frequently attempted to resolve doctrinal controversies regarding the nature of Christ. During a visit to Syria, Theodosius met the monk Nestorius, a renowned preacher. Nestorius was appointed as archbishop of Constantinople in 428 and became involved in a Christological dispute between two groups. One group called the Virgin Mary Theotokos ("birth-giver of God"), based on God being born a man in Christ, and the other rejected the title, based on God being eternal and thus could not be born. Nestorius's compromise, the title Christotokos ("birth-giver of Christ"), was rejected; he was accused of separating Christ's divine and human natures, resulting in "two Christs", in a doctrine later called Nestorianism. Though initially enjoying Theodosius's favor, Nestorius was strongly opposed by Archbishop Cyril of Alexandria and eventually lost Theodosius's support. Nestorius had also alienated the emperor's sister, Pulcheria. At Nestorius's request, the emperor convened the First Council of Ephesus in 431 to allow Nestorius to contest Cyril's accusations of heresy. The council was divided between the Cyrillians and the Nestorians, with Theodosius ultimately favoring the Cyrillians. The council affirmed the title Theotokos and condemned Nestorius, who returned to his monastery in Syria and was eventually exiled to a remote monastery in Egypt.

Constantinopolitan abbot Eutyches reignited the theological dispute almost twenty years later by asserting the miaphysite view that Christ's divine and human nature were one. Eutyches was condemned by Archbishop Flavian of Constantinople for refusing to confess two natures after the union, but supported by the powerful Dioscurus of Alexandria, Cyril's successor. The Second Council of Ephesus in 449 restored Eutyches and deposed Flavian. The Chalcedonians opposed the decision, with Pope Leo I calling the council the "robber synod". Theodosius supported the outcome, but it was reversed by the Council of Chalcedon which was held a year after his death in 450.

== Death ==
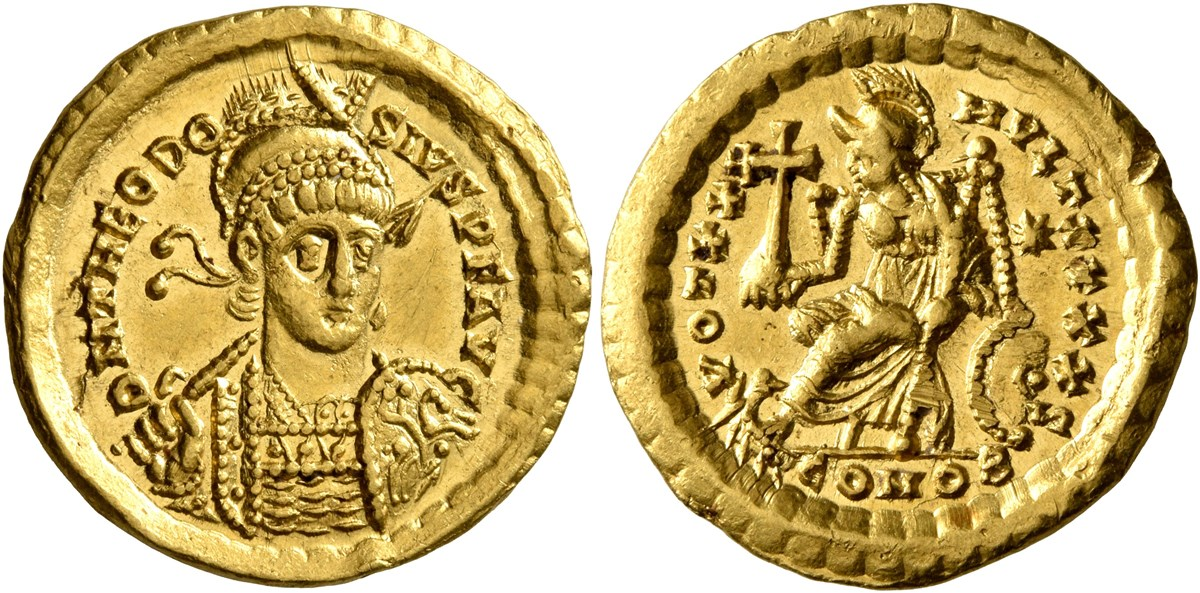
Theodosius II solidus

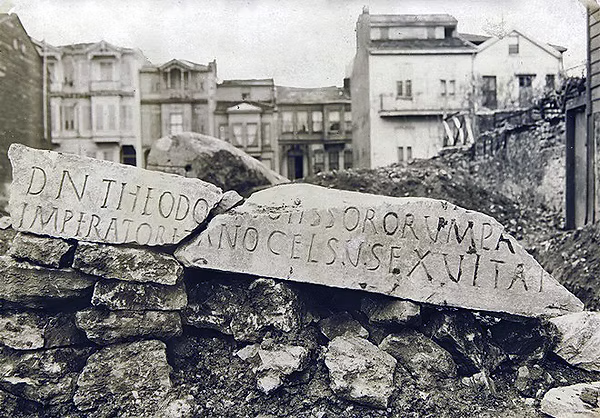
Fragments of an inscription belonging to a monumental column of Theodosius II. Found in the ancient suburb of Hebdomon.

Theodosius died on 28 July 450 as the result of falling off his horse. On 25 November, his sister Pulcheria married Marcian, a domesticus under the influential general Aspar, and he became emperor. The eunuch Chrysaphius was executed or murdered shortly after by the new imperial couple.

Like Constantine I and several of his successors, he was buried in the Church of the Holy Apostles, in a porphyry sarcophagus that was described in the 10th century by Constantine VII in the De Ceremoniis.

== Assessments and legacy ==
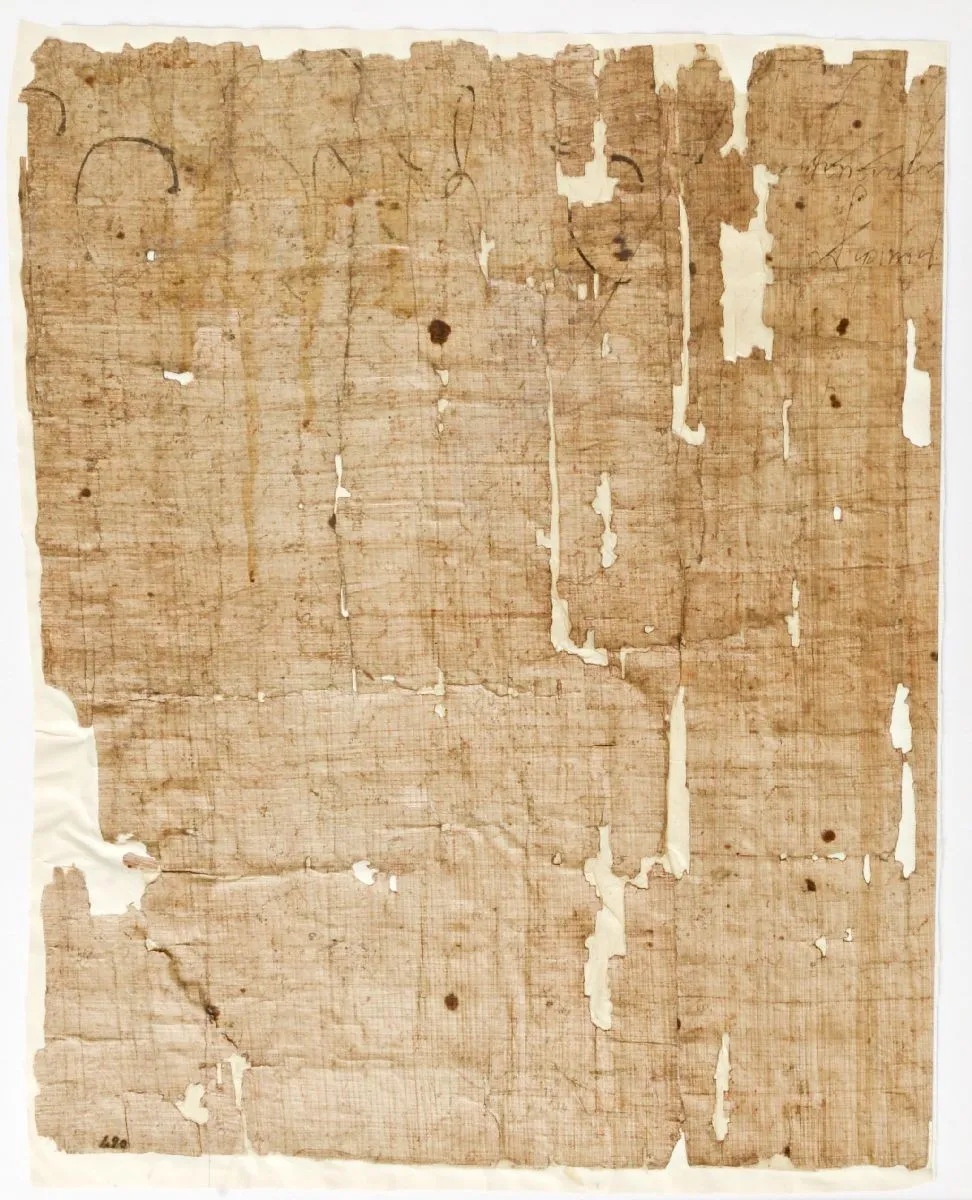
Papyrus with handwriting of Theodosius II. On the top right corner, the text reads bene valere te cupimus, roughly meaning "we hope that you are in good health". This is the only surviving handwriting of a pre-476 Roman emperor.

Theodosius is often seen by both ancient and modern historians as being constantly pushed around by his sister, wife, and eunuchs, particularly Chrysaphius among them. In the later decades of his life, Chrysaphius rose to prominence as one of the emperor's favorites. He favored the pro-Monophysite policy, influenced the foreign policy towards the Huns, and was resented by Pulcheria, general Zeno, and pro-Chalcedonian writers. According to Theodorus Lector, Theodosius was so unmindful of his surroundings that he accidentally signed his sister's note selling his wife, Eudocia, into slavery.

However, these views of Theodosius have been challenged in modern scholarship. Some historians argue that contrary to hostile ancient sources, Theodosius was more in control of his government. Others view that the government was controlled mostly by the high ranking civilian officials of the consistorium, and not by Pulcheria or Eudocia. Historian Christopher Kelly notes that the modern dismissal of Theodosius has origins in the Enlightenment disapproval, and argues that "the reign of Theodosius II should not be too quickly dismissed, simplified or partitioned."

Among ancient and medieval writers, Monophysites had a favorable opinion of Theodosius. Theodosius was also a very learned emperor, with a great aptitude for mathematics, history, astronomy, and writing, hence the nickname "the Calligrapher" applied to him by some later historians. Theodosius has been described by Kenneth Holum as "a man of intelligence and sincerity but little backbone."

He is venerated as Saint Theodosius II the Younger the Right-Believing by the Eastern Orthodox Church; his day is 29 July. He is also venerated as a saint by the Oriental Orthodox Churches for his support during the post-Chalcedonian controversy.

== Portrayals ==
He is played by Tim Curry in the 2001 miniseries Attila. For the sake of not having to explain a new Emperor in the East at the time of Attila's death, he is still shown alive by then, almost three years after his death.

== See also ==
- List of Byzantine emperors
- Theodosian dynasty

== Notes ==
Theodosius II Theodosian dynasty Born: 10 April 401 Died: 28 July 450
Regnal titles
Preceded by Arcadius	Eastern Roman emperor 408–450	Succeeded by Marcian
Political offices
Preceded by Arcadius Augustus V Honorius Augustus V	Roman consul 403 with Rumoridus	Succeeded by Honorius Augustus VI; Aristaenetus
Preceded by Arcadius Augustus VI; Anicius Petronius Probus	Roman consul II; 407 with Honorius Augustus VII	Succeeded by Anicius Auchenius Bassus; Philippus
Preceded by Anicius Auchenius Bassus	Roman consul III; 409 with Honorius Augustus VIII; Constantine Augustus	Succeeded by Varanes; Tertullus
Preceded by Varanes; Tertullus	Roman consul IV–V; 411–412 with Honorius Augustus IX (412)	Succeeded by Lucius; Heraclianus
Preceded by Constantius; Constans	Roman consul VI–VII; 415–416 with Honorius Augustus X Junius Quartus Palladius	Succeeded by Honorius Augustus XI; Flavius Constantius II
Preceded by Honorius Augustus XI; Flavius Constantius II	Roman consul VIII; 418 with Honorius Augustus XII	Succeeded by Monaxius; Plinta
Preceded by Monaxius; Plinta	Roman consul IX; 420 with Constantius III	Succeeded by Eustathius; Agricola
Preceded by Eustathius; Agricola	Roman consul X 422 with Honorius Augustus XIII	Succeeded by Asclepiodotus; Avitus Marinianus
Preceded by Castinus; Victor	Roman consul XI; 425 with Valentinian Caesar; Iohannes Augustus (only in Rome)	Succeeded by Theodosius Augustus XII; Valentinian Augustus II
Preceded by Theodosius Augustus XI; Valentinian Caesar	Roman consul XII; 426 with Valentinian Augustus II	Succeeded by Hierius; Ardabur
Preceded by Florentius; Dionysius	Roman consul XIII; 430 with Valentinian Augustus III	Succeeded by Anicius Auchenius Bassus; Antiochus
Preceded by Aetius; Valerius	Roman consul XIV; 433 with Petronius Maximus	Succeeded by Aspar; Areobindus
Preceded by Aspar; Areobindus	Roman consul XV; 435 with Valentinian Augustus IV	Succeeded by Anthemius Isidorus; Flavius Senator
Preceded by Aetius II; Sigisvultus	Roman consul XVI; 438 with Anicius Acilius Glabrio Faustus	Succeeded by Theodosius Augustus XVII; Festus
Preceded by Theodosius Augustus XVI; Anicius Acilius Glabrio Faustus	Roman consul 439 with Festus	Succeeded by Valentinian Augustus V Anatolius
Preceded by Petronius Maximus II; Paterius	Roman consul XVII; 444 with Caecina Decius Aginatius Albinus	Succeeded by Valentinian Augustus VI; Nomus
