= Bassus (poet) =

1st century Roman poet

Bassus was a writer of ancient Rome who wrote Latin poetry, often with mythological themes. He lived in the 1st century CE.

Bassus was a contemporary of the writer Martial, and the subject of one of his epigrams, which itself is a pastiche or winking variation on an earlier epigram by the Greek writer Lucillius.

In it, taken at face value, it seems that Martial is advising a mythologically minded peer on a change of subject matter, to stop writing so much about Medea, Thyestes, Niobe, and Andromache, and instead consider as themes Deucalion (a titan associated with the flood myth) and Phaethon (child of the sun god Helios).

When read in light of the earlier Lucillius epigram, it is obvious that Martial is advising Bassus to either throw his poems in the water or burn them.

== Name confusion ==
Martial uses the name "Bassus" in several epigrams, though it is unclear which, if any, of these others refer back to this same poet Bassus, or indeed whether any of them were real people and not literary creations. Some scholars have proposed that this Bassus, and possibly others, were purely fictional.
