= Anicius Auchenius Bassus (consul 431) =

Flavius Anicius Auchenius Bassus (fl. 425–435) was a high official of the Western Roman Empire. He was appointed as consul by the Western court with Antiochus Chuzon as a colleague. In 435, he held the office of praetorian prefect of Italy for the second time.

== Biography ==
Bassus belonged to the noble gens Anicia; his father was the Anicius Auchenius Bassus who was consul in 408.

In 425, he held the rank of comes rerum privatarum at the Western court; the following year was praetorian prefect, perhaps of Italy.

He made accusations against Pope Sixtus III; when Emperor Valentinian III learned of these accusations, he ordered a synod to be convoked, at which the accusations were investigated, and the Pope cleared by 56 bishops.

== Bibliography ==
- Martindale, John R., ed. (1980). "Fl. Anicius Auchenius Bassus 8". The Prosopography of the Later Roman Empire: Volume II, AD 395–527. Cambridge: Cambridge University Press. pp. 220–221. ISBN 0-521-20159-4.

Political offices
Preceded by Flavius Theodosius Augustus XIII, Flavius Placidus Valentinianus Augustus III	Consul of the Roman Empire; 431 with Flavius Antiochus	Succeeded by Flavius Aetius, Flavius Valerius
