= Anicius Auchenius Bassus (consul 408) =

Roman politician and consul

Anicius Auchenius Bassus (fl. 408) was a politician of the Roman Empire. In 408, he was appointed consul. According to B. L. Twyman, he represents the "mainline" of the gens Anicia.

Bassus was probably the son of the Anicius Auchenius Bassus who was praefectus urbi in 382–383 and of Turrenia Honorata. He had a son, also called Anicius Auchenius Bassus, consul in 431. He wrote the epigraph for the tomb of Monica, Augustine of Hippo's mother. The actual stone on which it was written was rediscovered in 1945 in the church of Santa Aurea, in Ostia Antica.

== Bibliography ==
- Martindale, John R., ed. (1980). The Prosopography of the Later Roman Empire: Volume II, AD 395–527. Cambridge: Cambridge University Press. ISBN 0-521-20159-4.

Political offices
Preceded by Honorius, Theodosius II	Consul of the Roman Empire; 408 with Flavius Philippus	Succeeded by Honorius, Theodosius II, Constantine III
