= Anicius Auchenius Bassus (prefect) =

Roman senator

Anicius Auchenius Bassus (fl. 382–384) was a politician of the Roman Empire.

== Biography ==
Bassus was a native of Beneventum and patron of that city, as well as of Fabrateria Vetus and, by family tradition, of Naples. He belonged to the gentes Anicia and Auchenia; in some inscriptions he is called "restitutor generis Aniciorum", a reference either to the fact that he was adopted into the Anicii when no other male members were still alive or, more probably, that for some time he was the only male in the family, before he married and had sons. It is known that both his father and his grandfather were consuls; for this reason, his father has been identified with Amnius Manius Caesonius Nicomachus Anicius Paulinus, consul in 334, his grandfather with Amnius Anicius Iulianus, consul in 322. He married Turrenia Honorata and had several sons; one of them have been identified with the Anicius Auchenius Bassus attested as consul in 408 and a daughter with Turrenia Anicia Iuliana, wife of Quintus Clodius Hermogenianus Olybrius.

His career is known thanks to an inscription. At the beginning of the career he was questor candidatus and pretor tutelaris, a personal unification of several offices. Between 372 and 382 is to be dated his next office, the one of proconsul Campaniae, governor of Campania; in this capacity he is attested to have repaired the bath of Antium (CIL X, 6656). Between November 22, 382, and August 25, 383 he was praefectus urbi of Rome. In this capacity he investigated a dispute between Cyriades and Auxentius about the building of a bridge and a debt to the arcs vinaria (the money for wine donations to the people). In 384 he was investigated for possible misconduct in his office.

Bassus was a Christian; he probably was the judge in a trial for heresy against bishop Ephesius, of the Luciferian current, whom he acquitted. He was probably also the instigator of the motion in 382 to remove the altar of Victory from the Senate house and abolish state subsidies for traditional Roman cults.

== See also ==
- Lucius Turranius Venustus Gratianus

== Notes ==
Preceded by Valerius Severus	Prefect of Rome; 382–383	Succeeded by Aventius
