= Praetorian prefecture of the East =

One of four territorial divisions of the Late Roman Empire

Praetorian prefecture of the East Praefectura praetorio Orientis Ἐπαρχότης τῶν πραιτωρίων τῆς Ανατολῆς Ἑῴα Ὑπαρχία
- Praet. Prefecture of the East Roman Empire
- 337–7th century
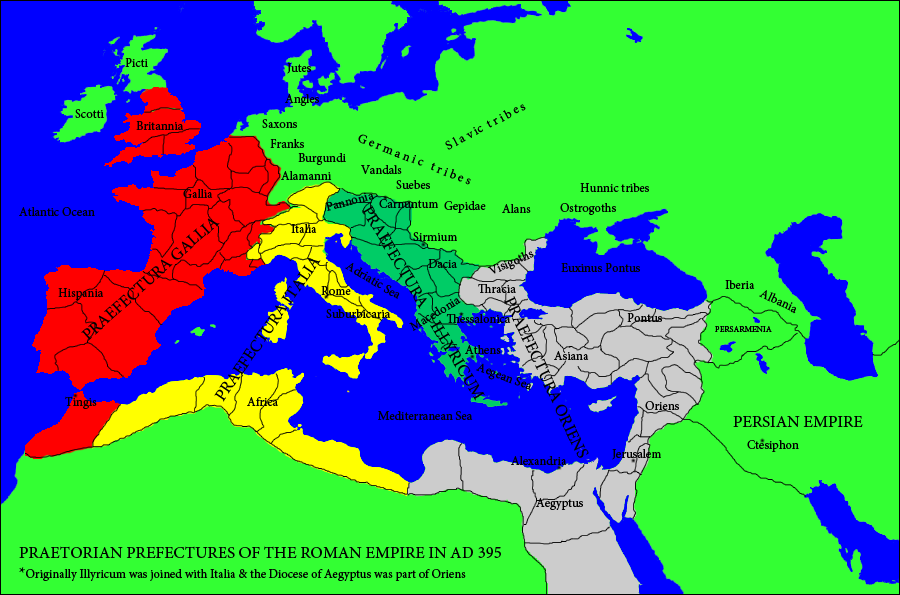
- Praetorian Prefectures of the Roman Empire (395). The Praetorian Prefecture of the East is in grey.
- Capital: Constantinople
- Historical era: Late Antiquity
  - Established: 337
  - Loss of Diocese of the East and Diocese of Egypt to the Rashidun Caliphate and reorganization into themata: 7th century
- Political subdivisions: Diocese of Thrace; Diocese of Asia; Diocese of Pontus; Diocese of the East; Diocese of Egypt

The praetorian prefecture of the East, or of the Orient (Latin: praefectura praetorio Orientis, Greek: ἐπαρχότης/ὑπαρχία τῶν πραιτωρίων τῆς ἀνατολῆς) was one of four large praetorian prefectures into which the Late Roman Empire was divided. As it comprised the larger part of the Eastern Roman Empire, and its seat was at Constantinople, the praetorian prefect was the second most powerful man in the East, after the Emperor, in essence serving as his first minister.

== Structure ==
The Prefecture was established after the death of Constantine the Great in 337, when the empire was split up among his sons and Constantius II received the rule of the East, with a praetorian prefect as his chief aide. The part allotted to Constantius encompassed four (later five) dioceses, each in turn comprising several provinces. The authority of the prefecture stretched from the Eastern Balkans, grouped into the Diocese of Thrace, to Asia Minor, divided into the dioceses of Asiana and Pontus, and the Middle East, with the dioceses of Orient and Egypt.

== List of known praefecti praetorio Orientis ==
Names and dates are taken from the Prosopography of the Later Roman Empire. Dates given are those in which the prefects are known to have held office, but not necessarily when they started or ended their terms.

=== 4th century ===
- 321 February 27: Pompeius Probus
- 324–326: Flavius Constantius
- 326 February 3–September 22: Evagrius (first term)
- 327 January 21–328 December 29 Valerius Maximus
- 329 March 15–October 18: Evagrius (second term)
- 330–335: Flavius Ablabius
- 338 December 27–340 August 27: Septimius Acindynus
- 340 October 11–344 July 6: FLavius Domitius Leontius
- 344?/346: Maiorinus
- 344?–351 summer: Flavius Philippus
- 351 autumn–353 July 3: Thalassius
- 353/354: Domitianus
- 354 July 25–358: Strategius Musonianus
- 358 August 24–360: Flavius Hermogenes
- 360 February 4–361 May 29: Helpidius
- 361 December–365 July 30: Saturninius Secundus (first term)
- 365 late summer: Nebridius
- 365 November 2–367 early: Saturninius Secundus (second term)
- 365/366: Araxius (under Procopius)
- 367 September 1–369 May 3: Auxonius
- 369 August 1–377 November 20: Domitius Modestus
- 378: Aburgius
- 378 late: Quintus Clodius Hermogenianus Olybrius
- 380 January 15–381 January 16: Neoterius
- 381 July 30–383 March 5: Florus
- 383 April 6–December 3: Postumianus
- 384 January 18–388 March 14: Maternus Cynegius
- 388 June 16–392 September: Eutolmius Tatianus
- 392 September 10–395 November 27: Flavius Rufinus
- 395 November 30–397 July 1: Flavius Caesarius (first term)
- 397 September 4–399 July 25: Flavius Eutychianus (first term)
- 399 August 17–October 2: Aurelianus (first term) (Note: Alan Cameron states that Aurelianus' first term lasted until April 400.)
- 399 December 11–400 July 12: Eutychianus (second term) (Note: Cameron's dates for Aurelianus overlap those of Eutychianus in 400)

=== 5th century ===
- 400 December 8–403 June 11: Flavius Caesarius (second term)
- 404 February 3–405 June 11: Flavius Eutychianus (third term)
- 405 July 10–414 April 18: Flavius Anthemius
- 414 May 10–November 30: Monaxius (first term)
- 414 December 30–416 May 10: Aurelianus (second term)
- 416 August 26–420 May 27: Monaxius (second term)
- 420 September 18–422 June 19: Flavius Eustathius
- 423 February 14–425 February 1: Asclepiodotus
- 425 May 5: Aetius
- 425 September 22–428 February 20: Hierius (first term)
- 428 April 21–430 February 11: Flavius Florentius (first term)
- 430 December 31–431 March 23: Antiochus Chuzon
- 431 March/432 March: Rufinus
- 432 March 28: Hierius (second term)
- 433 April 22–434 December 15: Flavius Taurus (first term)
- 435 January 29–436 August 4: Flavius Anthemius Isidorus
- 436 August 28–437 ?October: Darius
- 438 January 31–439 November 26: Flavius Florentius (second term)
- 439 December 6–441 August 18: Flavius Taurus Seleucus Cyrus
- 441/450: Eutychianus
- ?Twice in the 440s: Flavius Florentius
- 442 February 25: Thomas
- 442 August 21–443 May 22: Apollonius
- 444 February 26–July 20: Zoilus
- 444 November 29: Hermocrates
- 445 February 17: Flavius Taurus (second term)
- 447: Flavius Constantinus (first term)
- Before 448: Flavius Florentius Romanus Protogenes
- 448: Antiochus
- 448 November–449 April 14: Flavius Florentius Romanus Protogenes
- (?Late 444 –) 450 April 13: Hormisdas
- Before 451 October: Abgarus
- Before 451 October: Parnassius
- Early/mid 5th century: Bacchus
- Early/mid 5th century: Olympiodorus
- Late 450–455 August 1: Palladius
- 456 March/April–July 18: Flavius Constantinus (second term)
- 459 March 3: Flavius Constantinus (third term)
- 459 September 17–460 February 1: Flavius Vivianus
- 465 November 9: Pusaeus
- 466 February 28–March 6: Erythrius (first term)
- 467 April/468 February: Pusaeus
- 468 February 8–September 1: Nicostratus
- 469 March 8–470 January 1: Amasius
- 471 August 7–December 27: Constantinus
- 472 January 1–July 1: Erythrius (second term)
- 472 July–475 February 1: Dioscorus (first term)
- 475 September 1: Epinicus
- 475/476: Laurentius
- 476 December 17–480 May 1: Sebastianus (first term)
- 480 May/December: Dionysius
- 480 December 28: Aelianus (first term)
- 474/491: Erythrius (third term)
- 480/486: Flavius Illus Pusaeus
- 484 March 28–April 13: Sebastianus (second term)
- 484: Aelianus (second term, under the usurper Leontius)
- 486 July 1: Basilius
- 489 September 1: Dioscorus (second term)
- 490 May 21: Arcadius (first term)
- 491 July 1–30: Matronianus
- 491/505: Arcadius (second term)
- 491/518: Armenius
- Late 5th/early 6th century: Parnassius
- Late 5th/early 6th century: Illus
- 494–496 February 13: Hierius
- 496 April 1–July 21: Euphemius
- 497 February 15: Theodorus
- 498 February 1: Polycarpus

=== 6th century ===
- 502 February 15–505 January 1: Aspar Alypius Constantinus (first term)
- 505 April 19–506 November 20: Eustathius
- 510: Leontius
- 511–512: Zoticus
- ?512/515: Marinus (first term)
- 517 April 1–December 1: Sergius
- 518 December 1: Apion
- 519 November 9–December 1: Marinus (second term)
- 521 June 1–522 July: Flavius Theodorus Petrus Demosthenes (first term)
- 524 August 21–527 April/July: Archelaus
- before 528: Menas (first term)
- Before 528 February 13: Basilides
- 528 March 1: Atarbius
- 528 June 1–529 April 7: Menas (second term)
- 529 September 17–October 30: Flavius Theodorus Petrus Demosthenes (second term)
- 530 March 18–531 February 20: Iulianus
- 531 February/April–532 January 14: Ioannes (first term)
- 532 January/October: Phocas
- 532 October 18–541 May 7: Ioannes (second term)
- 541 February: Flavius Comitas Theodorus Bassus (deputy for Ioannes)
- 541 June 1–542 December 18 (-?543): Theodotus (first term)
- 543 July 16–546 May 1: Peter Barsymes (first term)
- 546/547–?548: Theodotus (second term)
- 548 early–c. September 15/17: Flavius Comitas Theodorus Bassus
- 548 September/October: Eugenius
- 551 June 15: Flavius Marianus Iacobus Marcellus Aninas Addaeus
- 551 late–552 early: Flavius Ioannes Theodorus Menas Narses Chnoubammon Horion Hephaestus
- 553 February 8–April 15: Areobindus
- 555 June 1–562 May: Peter Barsymes (second term)
- 563 December 21: Leo
- 572 May 18: Diomedes
- 577/578: Gregorius
- 579: Unknown
- Late 6th century: Theodorus Picridius
- 6th century: Plato
- ?598: Georgius
- Before 602: Constantine Lardys
- 605 or 607: Theodorus
- ?615 or 626: Alexander
- 615/616: Olympius

== Sources ==
- Cameron, Alan (1977). "Some Prefects Called Julian". Byzantion. 47. Peeters Publishers: 42–64. ISSN 0378-2506. JSTOR 44170499.
- Martindale, John R.; Jones, A. H. M.; Morris, John, eds. (1971). The Prosopography of the Later Roman Empire: Volume I, AD 260–395. Cambridge: Cambridge University Press. ISBN 0-521-07233-6.
- Martindale, John R., ed. (1980). The Prosopography of the Later Roman Empire: Volume II, AD 395–527. Cambridge: Cambridge University Press. ISBN 0-521-20159-4.
- Martindale, John R., ed. (1992). The Prosopography of the Later Roman Empire: Volume III, AD 527–641. Cambridge: Cambridge University Press. ISBN 0-521-20160-8.
- Palme, Bernhard (2007). "The Imperial Presence: Government and Army". Egypt in the Byzantine World, 300-700. Cambridge University Press. pp. 244–270. ISBN 9780521871372.
