= Dionysius (consul 429) =

(Flavius) Dionysius was a Roman politician and military officer in the fifth century AD.

== Career ==
Dionysius was from Thrace. Between 428 and 431 AD, Dionysius served as Comes and Magister Militum of the East. In 428 AD, he escorted Nestorius, the new Patriarch of Constantinople from his see in Antioch to his new seat. In 429 AD, he held the consulship together with Flavius Florentius as his colleague. In 431 AD, Dionysius took part in the Council of Ephesus. In 434 AD, he once again served as Magister Militum. Between 435 and 440 AD, Dionysius was, together with Plinta, ambassador to the King of the Huns, Rugila.
