= Olybrius =

Western Roman emperor in 472

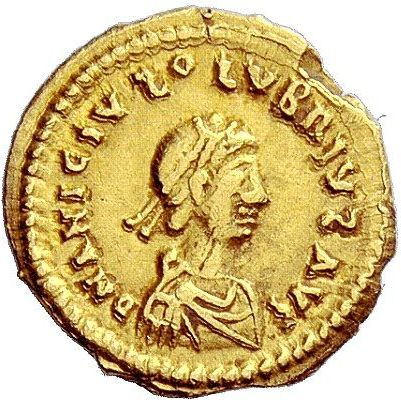
- Tremissis of Olybrius, marked: d·n· anicius olybrius aug· ("Our Lord Anicius Olybrius Augustus")

Roman emperor in the West
- Reign: 11 July – 2 November 472
- Predecessor: Anthemius
- Successor: Glycerius
- Eastern emperor: Leo I
- Born: Rome, Italy
- Died: 2 November 472
- Burial: Mausoleum of Honorius, Old St Peter's Basilica (probable)
- Spouse: Placidia
- Issue: Anicia Juliana
Names
- Anicius Olybrius
- Family: Anicia gens
- Dynasty: Valentinianic; Theodosian (both by marriage)
- Religion: Chalcedonian Christianity

Anicius Olybrius (died 2 November 472) was Roman emperor from July 472 until his death later that same year; his rule as augustus in the western Roman Empire was not recognised as legitimate by the ruling augustus in the eastern Roman Empire, Leo I (r. 457–474). He was in reality a puppet ruler raised to power by Ricimer, the magister militum of Germanic descent, and was mainly interested in religion, while the actual power was held by Ricimer and his nephew Gundobad.

== Biography ==
=== Family and early career ===
Olybrius was born in Rome, in the ancient and powerful gens Anicia, (Note: His relationship with such a prominent family was so noteworthy, that on his coins he spelled his family name in full.) of Italian descent.

According to the consensus of historians, he was related to the consul Anicius Hermogenianus Olybrius, whose wife and cousin, Anicia Juliana, had the same name that Olybrius gave to his own daughter. Other historians consider this questionable, as "Juliana" was a common name in the gens Anicia, and because Hermogenianus seems to have begotten only one daughter, who took chastity vows. Other possible fathers have therefore been proposed: either Anicius Probus (suggested by Settipani) or, according to some clues, Petronius Maximus.

Olybrius married Placidia, younger daughter of western augustus Valentinian III (r. 425–455) and his wife Licinia Eudoxia, thus creating a bond between a member of the senatorial aristocracy and the conjoined Valentinianic–Theodosian dynasties. The year of their wedding is not recorded, although the historian Priscus implies it took place before Gaiseric's Vandals sacked Rome (June 2–16, 455). Oost has pointed out that in his chronicle Hydatius wrote Placidia was unmarried as of 455.

Steven Muhlberger points out that many of the events in the chronicle of Hydatius are based on hearsay, that problems with his chronology "resulted from delays and distortions in the best information to which he had access," and thus the evidence from Hydatius is not as decisive as Oost believed. Regardless, the powerful magister militum Aetius had forced Valentinian to betroth Placidia to his own son Gaudentius, so Olybrius could not have married her before Aetius's death.

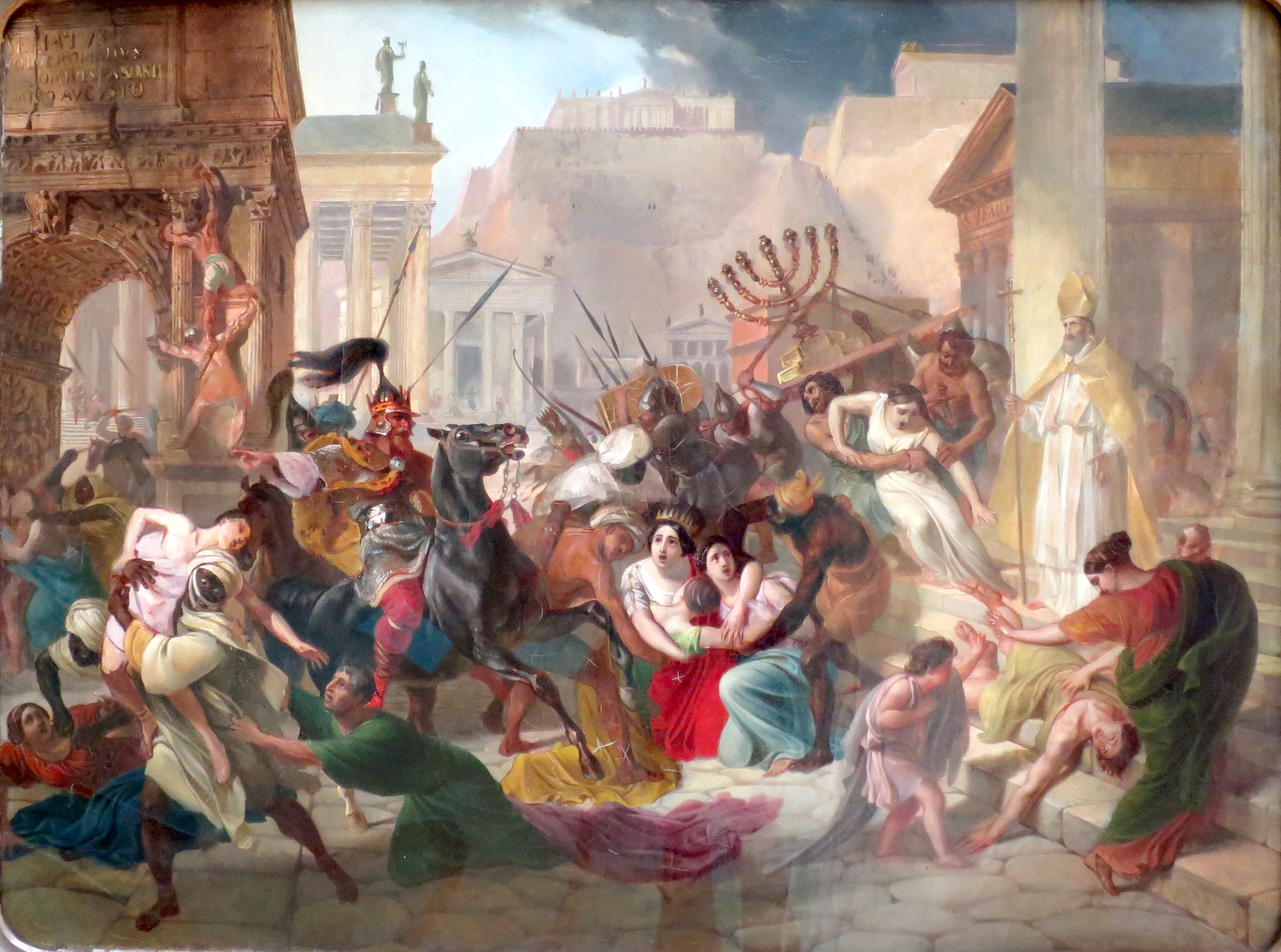
Gaiseric sacks Rome, by Karl Briullov. After the sack of Rome (455), Olybrius's wife Placidia was among the Roman captives whom the Vandals took to Africa; at that time Olybrius was in Constantinople.

Emperor Valentinian killed Aetius on 21 September 454. The following year, Valentinian was killed by some soldiers who had served under Aetius, probably instigated by the patricius Petronius Maximus, who succeeded to the throne. Petronius, who was a high-ranking imperial officer and a member of a family belonging to the senatorial aristocracy, married the augusta Licinia Eudoxia, widow of Valentinian. He also elevated his own son Palladius to the rank of caesar and had him marry Eudocia, elder daughter of Valentinian.

According to those historians who believe that Olybrius was Petronius's son, it was in 455 that Olybrius married Placidia, between 17 April, when Petronius was acclaimed augustus, and 31 May, when he died; this would explain the marriage between Olybrius and Valentinian's younger daughter as a move to secure Petronius's legitimacy as emperor.

Another possibility is that Olybrius and Placidia were engaged in 455, and only after Gaiseric freed her from his possession in the early 460s were they at last married. Oost mentions this possibility in his book Galla Placidia Augusta. The surviving evidence is not sufficient to allow us to decide between these alternatives.

=== Twice candidate for the throne ===
The Vandals, led by King Gaiseric, took advantage of the confusion and weakness of the Western Empire in the wake of Valentinian's turbulent succession, moving into Italy and sacking Rome in June 455. Before returning to Africa, the Vandals took Licinia Eudoxia and her two daughters as hostages. According to the 6th-century historian John Malalas, Olybrius was in Constantinople at the time. On the other hand, the 6th-century chronicler Evagrius Scholasticus writes that Olybrius had fled Rome on the approach of Gaiseric's army.

During his residence in the Eastern capital, Olybrius expressed his interest in religious matters. He met Daniel the Stylite, who, according to Christian tradition, prophesied the liberation of Licinia Eudoxia. In the meantime, the Western Empire went through a rapid succession of Emperors. After Petronius, the Gallic-Roman senator Avitus was proclaimed Emperor by the Visigoth king Theodoric II and ruled for two years; he was deposed by Majorian, who ruled for four years before being killed by his general Ricimer in 461.

Gaiseric supported Olybrius to assume the vacant Western throne because Gaiseric's son Huneric and Olybrius had married the two daughters of Valentinian III, and with Olybrius on the throne, Gaiseric could exert great influence on the Western Empire. Therefore, Gaiseric freed Licinia Eudoxia (fulfilling Daniel's prophesy) and her daughter Placidia (Olybrius's wife), but he did not cease his raids on Italy's coasts. His project failed, however, as Ricimer, who had become the Magister militum of the West, chose Libius Severus as new Emperor (461–465). Placidia was now free, however, joining her husband at Constantinople, where they had a daughter, Anicia Juliana, in 462.

Olybrius was nearly chosen for the Western throne again in 465, after Libius Severus died. Gaiseric was again his major supporter, but the Eastern Emperor Leo I chose the noble Procopius Anthemius. Olybrius's association with Gaiseric did not harm his career, however, as the Eastern court chose him for the high honour of the consulate in 464.

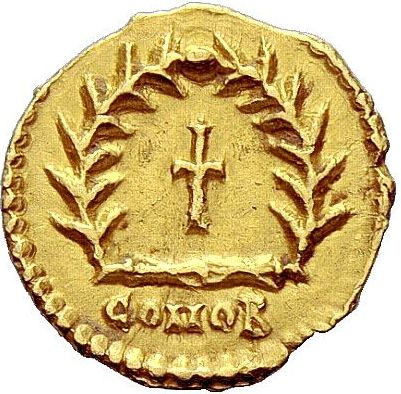
Reverse of a tremissis of Olybrius, with a Christian cross in a wreath

=== Rise to the throne ===
Sources agree that Olybrius rose to the western throne thanks to the western magister militum Ricimer. They differ over the timing and order of the events leading to his ascent.

In the version provided by John Malalas, and championed by J. B. Bury, Olybrius was sent to Italy in 472 by Leo I, ostensibly to mediate between Ricimer and Anthemius, who was besieged by Ricimer in Rome. Once he had accomplished this, Olybrius would then continue to Carthage and offer a peace treaty to Gaiseric. Leo suspected that Olybrius favored the Vandal king, however, and would secretly take his side and betray the suspicious Emperor. Leo had Olybrius followed by another envoy bearing a letter for Anthemius stating:

I have removed Aspar and Ardaburius from this world, so that no one who might oppose me would survive. But you also must kill your son-in-law Ricimer, lest there be anyone who might betray you. Moreover, I also have sent the patrician Olybrius to you; I wish you to kill him, so that you might reign, ruling rather than serving others.

Ricimer intercepted the letter at Ostia and, having showed it to Olybrius, convinced him to accept the purple. From Ricimer's point of view, Olybrius was a good candidate, as a member of the Roman senatorial aristocracy and the husband of Placidia; his marriage to her makes him the last emperor of the conjoined Valentinianic–Theodosian dynasties to rule in the west. Ricimer had Anthemius killed and Olybrius acclaimed Emperor (11 July 472).

The competing version of events does not mention the secret letter. Instead, after arriving in Rome, Olybrius was proclaimed emperor several months before Anthemius's death, in April or May 472. Ricimer then besieged the part of Rome where Anthemius was for several months until the lawful Emperor was abandoned by his partisans, captured in a church, and put to death by Gundobad, Ricimer's nephew. This version implies that Olybrius was secretly supported by the Emperor Leo, which explains why Leo sent him there. Three sources – Theophanes, the Paschal Chronicle, and Paullus Diaconus – support this version. Edward Gibbon accepts this implication as fact, although none of the three sources explicitly state that Leo supported Olybrius. What other reason could there be, Bury asks, then answers his own rhetorical question: "the facts that Anthemius was Leo's chosen candidate, his filius, and that Olybrius was the friend of his foe Genseric, are a strong counter-argument."

=== Reign and death ===
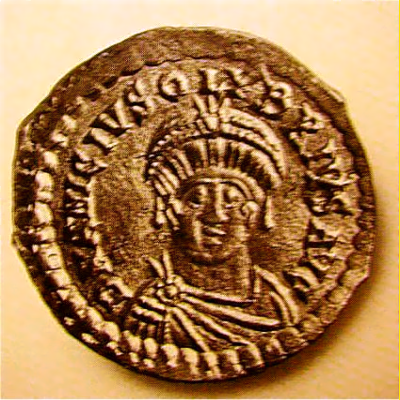
Obverse of a solidus of Olybrius, with a frontal portrait

The reign of Olybrius was short and uneventful. Soon after the death of Anthemius, Ricimer also died, on 9 or 19 August; his nephew Gundobad was elevated to magister militum in his place. Very little is known of Olybrius's policy; in his Vita Epifanius, Ennodius describes him as a pious man who acted accordingly. As evidence, he had minted a new series of gold coins bearing a cross and the new legend SALVS MVNDI ("Welfare of the World") instead of the usual SALVS REIPVBLICAE ("Welfare of the State"). (Note: Grieson and Mays, Chronology. It is possible that this theme was chosen to mark an opposition to Anthemius, who had studied in a neo-Platonic school and was suspected of planning to restore the pagan cults.) It is also noteworthy that Olybrius is depicted on his coins without helm and spear, common symbols on his predecessors' coinage, suggesting he had little interest in military matters.

Olybrius had a palace in the Tenth region of Constantinople at one end of the Mese, the main street, along the Constantinianae. Olybrius also paid for the restoration of the nearby church of Saint Euphemia in Chalcedon, which had been chosen by the augusta Pulcheria (r. 414–453), sister of Theodosius II (r. 402–450), for the Council of Chalcedon in 451. This choice was a sign of the bond between Olybrius, a Roman senator, with the imperial Theodosian dynasty.

Olybrius died of dropsy after seven months of rule, most likely on 2 November.

== Olybrius in culture ==
In 1707, Apostolo Zeno and Pietro Pariati wrote a libretto entitled Flavio Anicio Olibrio. The story told in the opera is quite different from the real one, despite the fact that Zeno claimed to use several historical sources (Evagrius Scholasticus l.2.c.7, Procopius of Caesarea, Historia Vandalorum, l.1, Paul the Deacon, vi): Ricimer captures Rome, frees his sister Teodolinda and enslaves Placidia, daughter of Valentinian III; a little later, Olybrius frees Rome and Placidia, and marries her.

The libretto was written for a dramma per musica in three acts by Francesco Gasparini, performed that same year in the Teatro San Cassiano in Venice, but the same libretto was put to music also by Nicola Porpora (1711, in Naples, as Il trionfo di Flavio Anicio Olibrio), (Note: Performed in Rome in 1722, it was the début in that city of the then seventeen-years-old Farinelli by Leonardo Vinci (Naples, 1728, as Ricimero), and by Andrea Bernasconi (1737, Wien, as Flavio Anicio Olibrio o La tirannide debellata). The libretto was also rewritten for the Ricimero by Niccolo Jommelli, performed at the Teatro Argentina in Rome in 1740.)

== Notes ==
Regnal titles
Preceded by Anthemius	Western Roman emperor 472	Succeeded by Glycerius
Political offices
Preceded by Caecina Decius Basilius; Vivianus	Roman consul 464 with Rusticius	Succeeded by Hermenericus; Basiliscus
