= 455 =

455 in various calendars
- Gregorian calendar: 455; CDLV
- Ab urbe condita: 1208
- Assyrian calendar: 5205
- Balinese saka calendar: 376–377
- Bengali calendar: −139 – −138
- Berber calendar: 1405
- Buddhist calendar: 999
- Burmese calendar: −183
- Byzantine calendar: 5963–5964
- Chinese calendar: 甲午年 (Wood Horse); 3152 or 2945 — to — 乙未年 (Wood Goat); 3153 or 2946
- Coptic calendar: 171–172
- Discordian calendar: 1621
- Ethiopian calendar: 447–448
- Hebrew calendar: 4215–4216
- Hindu calendars
- Vikram Samvat: 511–512
- Shaka Samvat: 376–377
- Kali Yuga: 3555–3556
- Holocene calendar: 10455
- Iranian calendar: 167 BP – 166 BP
- Islamic calendar: 172 BH – 171 BH
- Javanese calendar: 340–341
- Julian calendar: 455; CDLV
- Korean calendar: 2788
- Minguo calendar: 1457 before ROC 民前1457年
- Nanakshahi calendar: −1013
- Seleucid era: 766/767 AG
- Thai solar calendar: 997–998
- Tibetan calendar: ཤིང་ཕོ་རྟ་ལོ་ (male Wood-Horse); 581 or 200 or −572 — to — ཤིང་མོ་ལུག་ལོ་ (female Wood-Sheep); 582 or 201 or −571

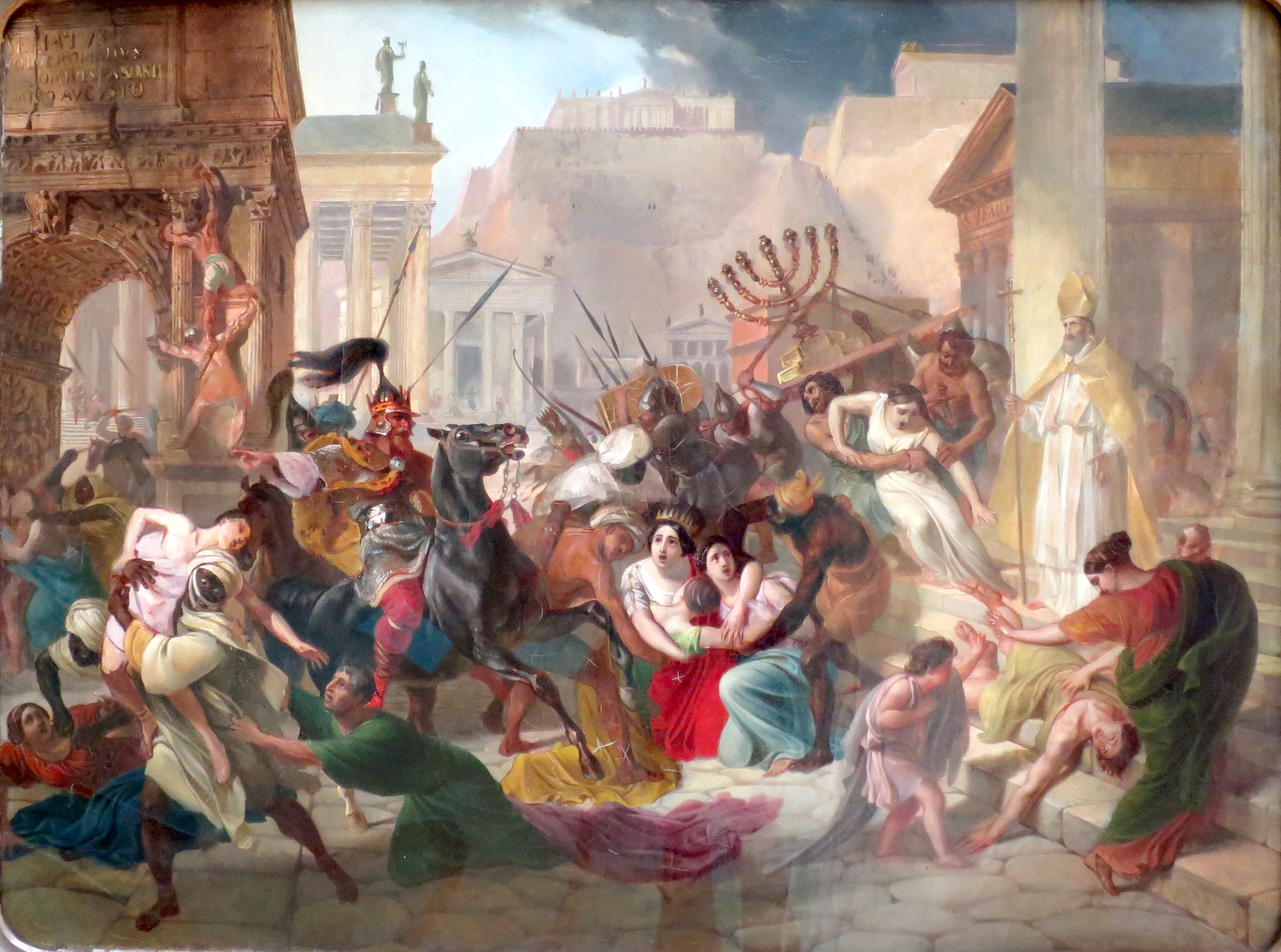
King Genseric sacks Rome (455)

Year 455 (CDLV) was a common year starting on Saturday of the Julian calendar. At the time, it was known as the Year of the Consulship of Valentinianus and Anthemius (or, less frequently, year 1208 Ab urbe condita). The denomination 455 for this year has been used since the early medieval period, when the Anno Domini calendar era became the prevalent method in Europe for naming years.

== Events ==
=== By place ===
==== Roman Empire ====
- March 16 – Emperor Valentinian III, age 35, is assassinated by two Hunnic retainers of the late Flavius Aetius, while training with the bow on the Campus Martius (Rome), ending the Theodosian dynasty. His primicerius sacri cubiculi, Heraclius, is also murdered.
- March 17 – Petronius Maximus, former domesticus ("elite bodyguard") of Aetius, becomes (with support of the Roman Senate) emperor of the Western Roman Empire. He secures the throne by bribing officials of the imperial palace. Maximus consolidates his power by a forced marriage with Licinia Eudoxia, widow of Valentinian III.
- Maximus appoints Avitus, most trusted general, to the rank of magister militum and sends him on an embassy to Toulouse, to gain the support of the Visigoths. He elevates his son Palladius to Caesar and has him marry Eudocia, eldest daughter of Valentinian III.
- May 31 – Maximus is stoned to death by an angry mob while fleeing Rome. A widespread panic occurs when many citizens hear the news that the Vandals are plundering the Italian mainland.
- June 2 – Sack of Rome: King Genseric leads the Vandals into Rome, after he has promised Pope Leo I not to burn and plunder the city. Genseric sacks the city for a period of two weeks. Eudoxia and her daughters, Eudocia and Placidia, are taken hostage. The loot is sent to the harbour of Ostia and loaded into ships, from whence the Vandals depart and return to Carthage.
- July 9 – Avitus is proclaimed Roman emperor at Toulouse, and later recognised by the Gallic chiefs in Viernum (near Arles).
- September 21 – Avitus enters Rome with a Gallic army. He restores the imperial authority in Noricum (modern Austria) and leaves a Gothic force under Remistus, Visigoth general (magister militum), at Ravenna.
- The Ostrogoths conquer Pannonia and Dalmatia.

==== Britannia ====
- Battle of Aylesford: At a place named Agaelesthrep (often identified as Aylesford (Kent), Hengist fight the native Britons. His brother Horsa is killed and his son Oisc takes his place. According to the account preserved in Nennius, they were opposed by Vortimer.

==== Asia ====
- Skandagupta succeeds Kumaragupta I as ruler of the Gupta Empire (India). During his reign he crushes the Hun invasion; however, the expense of the wars drains the empire's resources and contributes to its decline.
- Gaero becomes king of the Korean kingdom of Baekje.

==== Mesoamerica ====
- Earliest recorded date at Chichen Itza on the Yucatán Peninsula (Mexico) (approximate date).

=== By topic ===
==== Commerce ====
- Barter economy replaces organized trade as Romans and other citizens desert their towns for the countryside, where they will be less vulnerable to barbarian raids (approximate date).

==== Medicine ====
- The city of Vindobona (Vienna) is struck by an epidemic that spreads through the Roman provinces. The disease is probably streptococcus or a form of scarlet fever with streptococcus pneumoniae (approximate date).

== Births ==
- Rusticus, archbishop of Lyon (approximate date)
- Wang Baoming, empress of the Southern Qi (d. 512)

== Deaths ==
- March 16
  - Valentinian III, emperor of the Western Roman Empire (b. 419)
  - Heraclius, Roman courtier (primicerius sacri cubiculi )
- May 31 – Petronius Maximus, emperor of the Western Roman Empire
- Biyu of Baekje, king of Baekje
- Horsa, leader of the Anglo-Saxons (approximate date)
- Kumaragupta I, ruler of the Gupta Empire (India)
- Niall Noigiallach, High King of Ireland (approximate date)
- Palladius, son of Petronius Maximus (approximate date)
- Prosper of Aquitaine, disciple and Christian writer (approximate date)
