= 5th century =

One hundred years, from 401 to 500

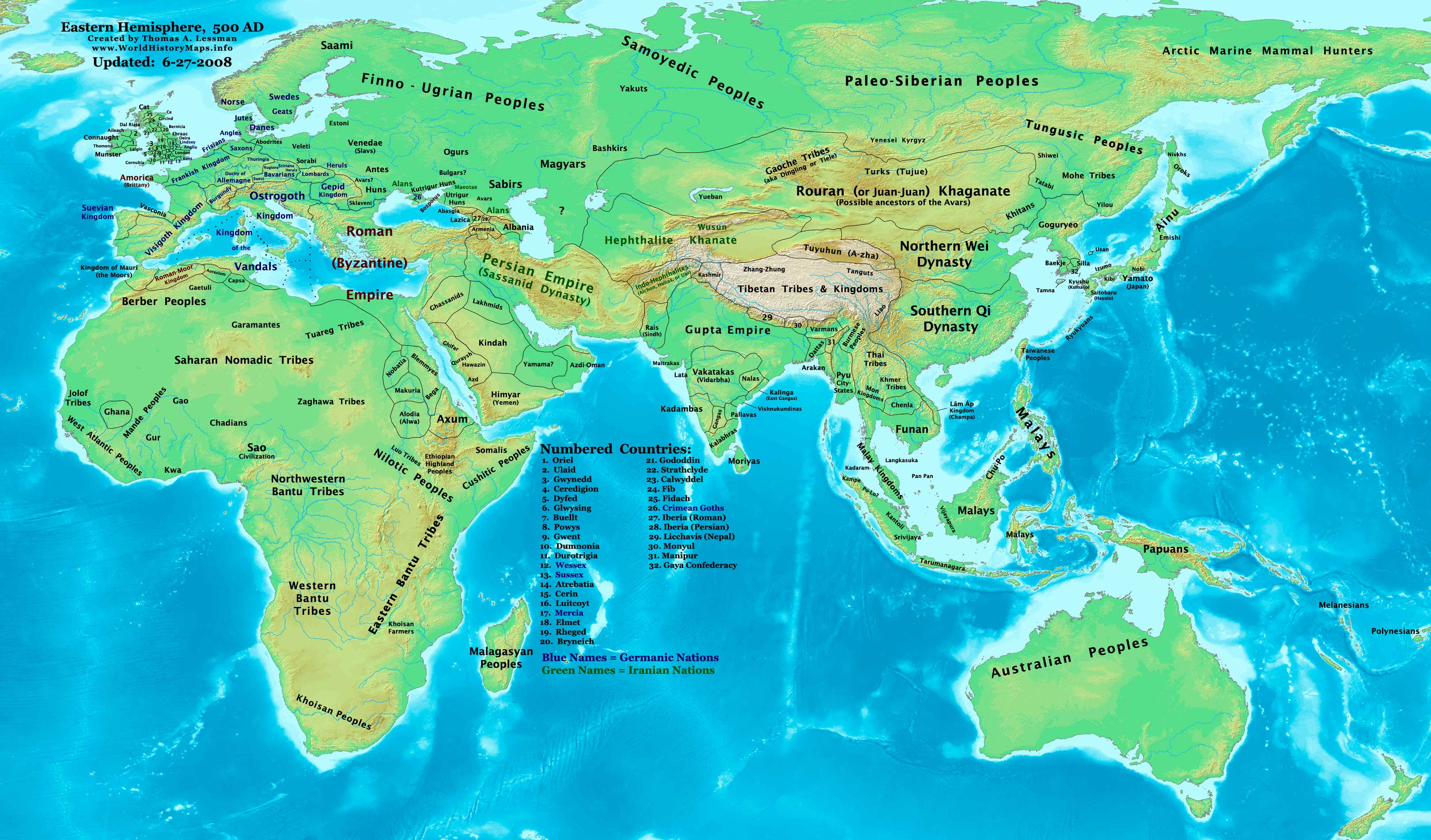
Eastern Hemisphere at the end of the 5th century AD.

The 5th century is the time period from AD 401 (represented by the Roman numerals CDI) through AD 500 (D) in accordance with the Julian calendar. The 5th century is noted for being a period of migration and political instability throughout Eurasia.

It saw the collapse of the Western Roman Empire, which came to a formal end in 476 AD. This empire had been ruled by a succession of weak emperors, with the real political might being increasingly concentrated among military leaders. Internal instability allowed a Visigoth army to reach and ransack Rome in 410. Some recovery took place during the following decades, but the Western Empire received another serious blow when a second foreign group, the Vandals, occupied Carthage, capital of an extremely important province in Africa. Attempts to retake the province were interrupted by the invasion of the Huns under Attila. After Attila's defeat, both Eastern and Western empires joined forces for a final assault on Vandal North Africa, but this campaign was a spectacular failure.

In China, the period of the Sixteen Kingdoms continued. This was characterized by the formation and collapse of small sub-kingdoms, ruled by warring ethnic groups. After the fall of the Former Qin towards the end of the previous century, the north of China was once again reunited by Northern Wei in 439. Meanwhile, in the Eastern Jin dynasty, the Jin statesman and general Liu Yu consolidated his power and forced the last Emperor of the Jin dynasty, Emperor Gong of Jin, to abdicate to him in 420. This created the (Liu) Song dynasty, which was also the starting point of the period known as the Northern and Southern dynasties.

Towards the end of the 5th century, the Gupta Empire of India was invaded from Central Asia and occupied by elements of the Huna peoples. These peoples may have been related to the Huns who devastated Rome during the same period.

== Events ==
- 380 – 415: Chandragupta II reigns over the golden age of the Gupta Empire.
- 399 – 412: The Chinese Buddhist monk Faxian sails through the Indian Ocean and travels throughout Sri Lanka and India bring and gather Buddhist scriptures.
- 401: Kumarajiva, a Buddhist monk and translator of sutras into Chinese, arrives in Chang'an.
- Early 5th century: Baptistry of Neon, Ravenna, Italy, is built.
- 5th century: North Acropolis, Tikal, Guatemala, is built. Mayan culture.
- 405: Mesrop Mashtots introduces number 36 of the 38 letters of the newly created Armenian Alphabet.
- 406: The eastern frontier of the Western Roman Empire collapses as waves of Suebi, Alans, and Vandals cross the then-frozen river Rhine near Mainz and enter Gaul.
- 407: Constantine III leads many of the Roman military units from Britain to Gaul and occupies Arles (Arelate). This is generally seen as Rome's withdrawal from Britain.
- 410: Rome ransacked by the Visigoths led by King Alaric.
- 411: Suebi establish the first independent Christian kingdom of Western Europe in Gallaecia.
- 413: St. Augustine, Bishop of Hippo, begins to write The City of God.
- 415 – 455: Kumaragupta, Gupta emperor.
- 420: The Jin dynasty comes to an end by Liu Yu.
- 420 – 589: Northern and Southern dynasties in China.
- 426: K'inich Yax K'uk' Mo' reestablishes Copan.

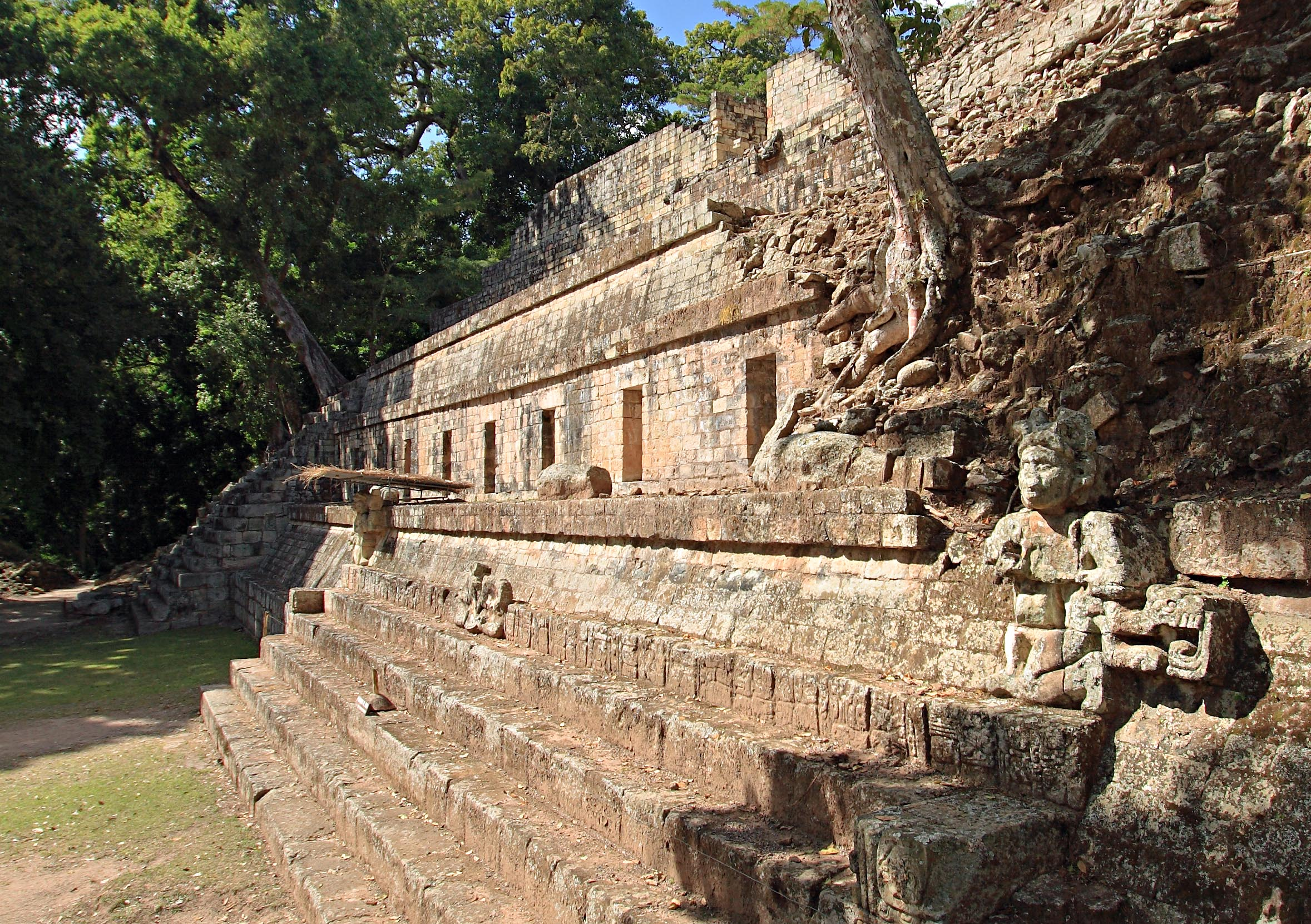
Copan

- 430: The Ilopango volcano erupts, devastating the Mayan cities in present-day El Salvador.
- 431: First Council of Ephesus, the third ecumenical council which upholds the title Theotokos or "mother of God", for Mary, the mother of Jesus Christ.
- 439: Vandals conquer Carthage.
- At some point after 440, the Anglo-Saxons settle in Britain. The traditional story is that they were invited there by Vortigern.
- 450: Historical linguist Albert C. Baugh dates Old English from around this year.
- 450: Several stone inscriptions are made witness to edicts from West Java. Amongst others, the Tugu inscription announces decrees of Purnavarman, the King of Tarumanagara, one of the earliest Hindu kingdoms of Java. (up until the year 669)
- 451: Council of Chalcedon, the fourth ecumenical council which taught of Jesus Christ as one divine person in two natures.
- 451: The Persians declare war on the Armenians.
- 451: The Huns under Attila facing the Romans and the Visigoths are defeated in the Battle of Chalons.
- 452: The Metropolis of Aquileia is destroyed by Attila and his army.
- 452: Pope Leo I meets in person with Attila on the Mincio River and convinces him not to ransack Rome.
- 453: Death of Attila. The Hunnic Empire is divided between Attila's sons.
- 454: Battle of Nedao. Germanic tribes destroy the main Hunnic army and do away with Hunnic domination.
- 455: Vandals sack Rome.
- 455: The city of Chichen Itza is founded in Mexico.
- 455 – 467: Skandagupta, the last great Gupta emperor.
- 469: Death of Dengizich, last Khan of the Hunnic Empire.
- 470: Riothamus, King of the Britons, helps the Roman Emperor in Brittany against the Visigoths.
- 476: Deposition of Romulus Augustulus by Odoacer: traditional date for the Fall of Rome in the West.
- 477 or 495: Chan Buddhists found the Shaolin Monastery on Mount Song in Henan, China.
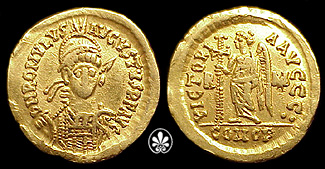
- Romulus Augustus, Last Western Roman Emperor
  480: Assassination of Julius Nepos, the last de jure Emperor of the Western Roman Empire, in Dalmatia.
- 481: Clovis I becomes King of the Western Franks upon the death of Childeric I.
- 482: Territory of modern Ukraine is established in Kiev.
- 486: Clovis defeats Syagrius and conquers the last free remnants of the Western Roman Empire.
- 490: (approximate date) Battle of Mount Badon. According to legend, British forces led by King Arthur defeated the invading Saxons.
- 491: King Clovis I defeats and subjugates the Kingdom of Thuringia in Germany.
- 493: Theodoric the Great ousts Odoacer to become King of Italy.
- 494: Northern Gaul is united under the Frankish King Clovis I, founder of the Merovingian dynasty.
- 496: Battle of Tolbiac. King Clovis subjugates the Alamanni, and is baptized Christian with a large number of Franks by Remigius, bishop of Reims.
- Buddhism reaches Burma and Indonesia.
- African and Indonesian settlers reach Madagascar.
- The Hopewell tradition comes to an end in North America.
- Tbilisi is founded by King Vakhtang Gorgasali.

== Inventions, discoveries, introductions ==
- Horse collar invented in China
- Chaturang, the precursor of chess, originated in India
- Heavy plow in use in Slavic lands
- First instance of a metal horseshoe found in Gaul
- Anglo-Saxon runes alphabet introduced in England
- Charkha (spinning wheel) originated in India
- Armenian alphabet created by Mesrob Mashtots c. 405
- The first use of Zero found in Bakhshali manuscript in India
