= 443 =

443 in various calendars
Gregorian calendar	443; CDXLIII
Ab urbe condita	1196
Assyrian calendar	5193
Balinese saka calendar	364–365
Bengali calendar	−151 – −150
Berber calendar	1393
Buddhist calendar	987
Burmese calendar	−195
Byzantine calendar	5951–5952
Chinese calendar	壬午年 (Water Horse); 3140 or 2933 — to — 癸未年 (Water Goat); 3141 or 2934
Coptic calendar	159–160
Discordian calendar	1609
Ethiopian calendar	435–436
Hebrew calendar	4203–4204
- Hindu calendars
Vikram Samvat	499–500
Shaka Samvat	364–365
Kali Yuga	3543–3544
Holocene calendar	10443
Iranian calendar	179 BP – 178 BP
Islamic calendar	185 BH – 184 BH
Javanese calendar	327–328
Julian calendar	443; CDXLIII
Korean calendar	2776
Minguo calendar	1469 before ROC 民前1469年
Nanakshahi calendar	−1025
Seleucid era	754/755 AG
Thai solar calendar	985–986
Tibetan calendar	ཆུ་ཕོ་རྟ་ལོ་ (male Water-Horse); 569 or 188 or −584 — to — ཆུ་མོ་ལུག་ལོ་ (female Water-Sheep); 570 or 189 or −583

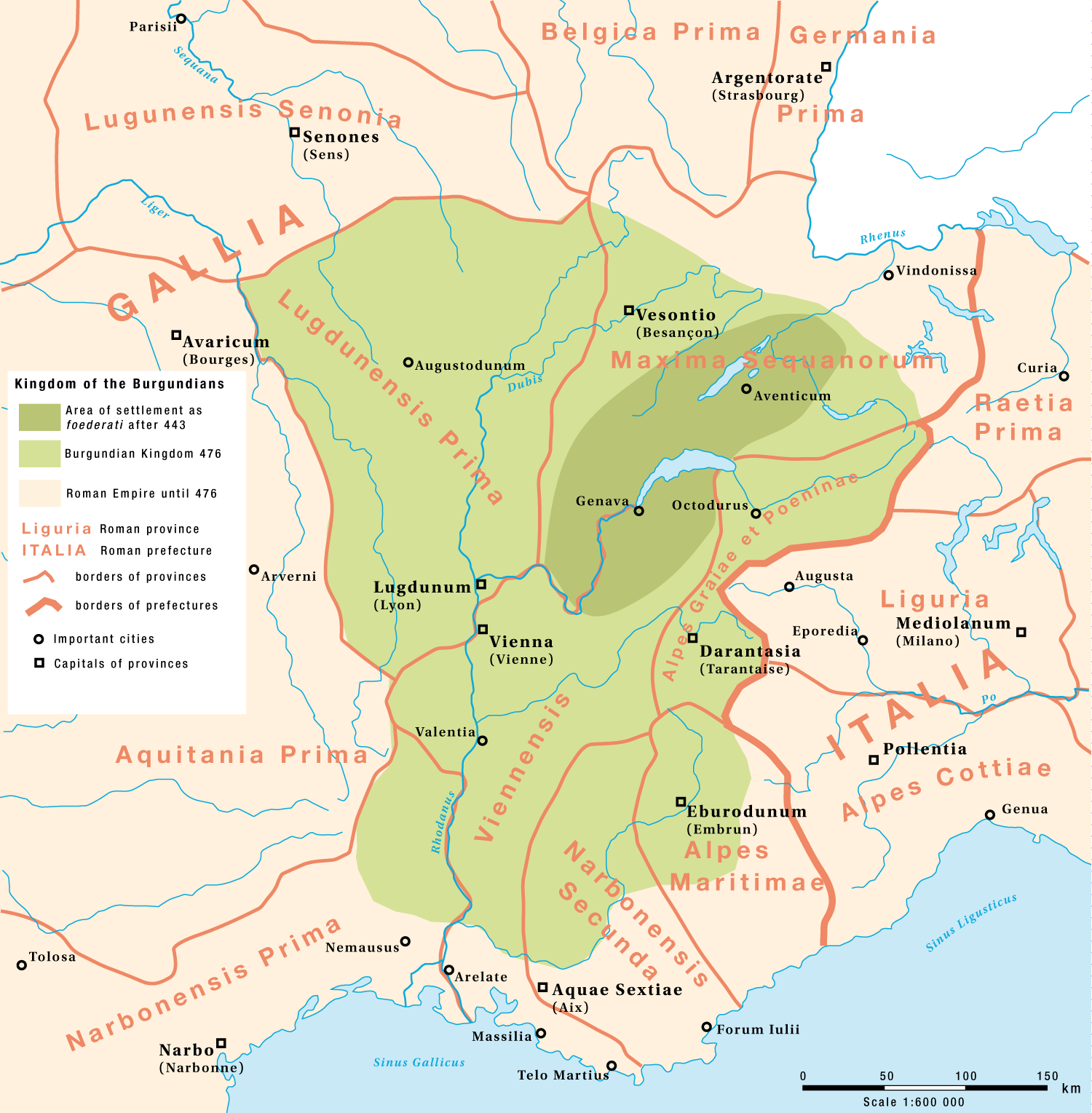
The Burgundian Kingdom (443–476)

Year 443 (CDXLIII) was a common year starting on Friday of the Julian calendar. At the time, it was known as the Year of the Consulship of Maximus and Paterius (or, less frequently, year 1196 Ab urbe condita). The denomination 443 for this year has been used since the early medieval period, when the Anno Domini calendar era became the prevalent method in Europe for naming years.

== Events ==
=== By place ===
==== Europe ====
- The Burgundians sign a peace treaty with Rome, agreeing to serve as foederati in the Roman army. They begin to move from the Upper Rhine and Flavius Aetius, commander-in-chief (magister militum), gives them land in the Geneva area (Maxima Sequanorum).
- Period of civil war and famine in Britain, caused by rival kingdoms and Pictish invasions; the situation aggravates tensions between Pelagian and Roman factions. Pro-Roman citizens migrate towards Gaul.

=== By topic ===
==== Religion ====
- Gunabhadra, Indian Buddhist monk, is an invited honored guest by emperor Wen of Liu Song (Liu Song dynasty). He translates the Lankavatara Sutra from Sanskrit into the Chinese language.

== Deaths ==
- Zong Bing, Chinese artist and musician
