= Albinus (consul 444) =

Albinus (floruit 440–448) was an aristocrat of the Roman Empire; he was made consul for 444 as the junior partner of Emperor Theodosius II. He may be a nephew of, or identical with, Caecina Decius Acinatius Albinus, praefectus urbi in 414.

== Life ==
Samuel Dill observed that "the Novellae seem to show him the great statesman of the time." He was Praetorian prefect of Gaul in 440, when Pope Leo I was called on to mediate a quarrel between him and the magister militum Aetius. (B.L. Twyman notes that Prosper's language "is conventional, and that the notice reveals only the fact of the resolution of a quarrel, not any actual friendship between Aetius and Albinus.") The cause of their quarrel is not known.

After Petronius Maximus ended his tenure as Praetorian prefect of Italy sometime in 441, a rapid succession of successors to the post followed until Albinus was appointed, prior to 17 August 443, for the second time we are told. He held this position until sometime between 3 June 448 and 17 June 449. Twyman finds the length of Albinus' prefecture "most striking"; Albinus was able to exert the authority of his office, bringing stability to the government. Ronald J. Weber suggests that the reason for Albinus' long tenure was not in response to the growing hegemony of Aetius, but "that he gained office in response to a perceived need and that the length of the crises facilitated his long tenure." Specifically, his lengthy term was a response to the loss of Africa to the Vandals, which was solemnized with an agreement to divide North Africa between Gaiseric and the Roman Empire (442). His family enjoyed extensive influence in the North African provinces, so he was best positioned to exert authority on behalf of the increasingly impoverished empire. As Weber concludes, "Caecina Decius Acinatius Albinus could have exercised his patronage in Africa. He may have been among the last to do it."

In 446, Albinus received the title of patricius. How long he lived after his tenure as Praetorian prefect of Italy is unknown.

== Notes ==
Political offices
Preceded by Petronius Maximus II; Paterius	Roman consul 444 with Theodosius Augustus XVIII	Succeeded by Valentinian Augustus VI; Nomus
