= 455th =

455th may refer to:

- 455th Air Expeditionary Wing, provisional United States Air Force USAFCENT unit
- 455th Flying Training Squadron, United States Air Force unit of the Air Education and Training Command (AETC)

== See also ==
- 455 (number)
- 455 (disambiguation)
- 455, the year 455 (CDLV) of the Julian calendar
- 455 BC
