= 472 =

472 in various calendars
- Gregorian calendar: 472; CDLXXII
- Ab urbe condita: 1225
- Assyrian calendar: 5222
- Balinese saka calendar: 393–394
- Bengali calendar: −122 – −121
- Berber calendar: 1422
- Buddhist calendar: 1016
- Burmese calendar: −166
- Byzantine calendar: 5980–5981
- Chinese calendar: 辛亥年 (Metal Pig); 3169 or 2962 — to — 壬子年 (Water Rat); 3170 or 2963
- Coptic calendar: 188–189
- Discordian calendar: 1638
- Ethiopian calendar: 464–465
- Hebrew calendar: 4232–4233
- Hindu calendars
- Vikram Samvat: 528–529
- Shaka Samvat: 393–394
- Kali Yuga: 3572–3573
- Holocene calendar: 10472
- Iranian calendar: 150 BP – 149 BP
- Islamic calendar: 155 BH – 154 BH
- Javanese calendar: 357–358
- Julian calendar: 472; CDLXXII
- Korean calendar: 2805
- Minguo calendar: 1440 before ROC 民前1440年
- Nanakshahi calendar: −996
- Seleucid era: 783/784 AG
- Thai solar calendar: 1014–1015
- Tibetan calendar: ལྕགས་མོ་ཕག་ལོ་ (female Iron-Boar); 598 or 217 or −555 — to — ཆུ་ཕོ་བྱི་བ་ལོ་ (male Water-Rat); 599 or 218 or −554

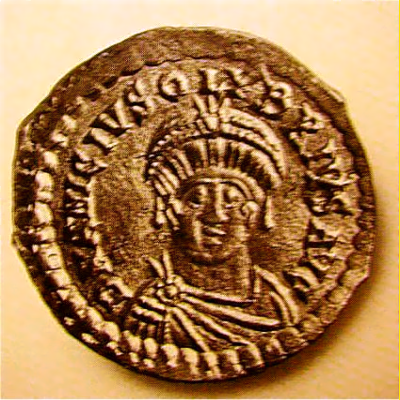
Coin of Emperor Olybrius

Year 472 (CDLXXII) was a leap year starting on Saturday of the Julian calendar. At the time, it was known as the Year of the Consulship of Festus and Marcianus (or, less frequently, year 1225 Ab urbe condita). The denomination 472 for this year has been used since the early medieval period, when the Anno Domini calendar era became the prevalent method in Europe for naming years.

== Events ==
=== By place ===
==== Roman Empire ====
- The Western Roman Empire enters a period of unrest. Relations between Ricimer, de facto ruler, and Emperor Anthemius deteriorate completely. Epiphanius, bishop of Pavia, negotiates a peace agreement.
- July 11 – Anthemius, besieged in the part of Rome he controls until his troops are defeated, is caught while fleeing the city disguised as a supplicant in the Old St. Peter's Basilica (or at the church of Santa Maria in Trastevere), and later beheaded by Gundobad or Ricimer. Ricimer proclaims Olybrius emperor. Ricimer's nephew, the Burgundian general Gundobad, assumes command of the Western army and holds de facto power in the Empire.
- August 18 – Ricimer dies at his palace of malignant fever, vomiting blood.
- November 2 – Olybrius dies of dropsy. During his four months' rule he has been mainly interested in religion.
- Mount Vesuvius erupts. During the volcanic eruption the whole of southern Europe is blanketed by ash.

== Births ==
- Emilian of Cogolla, Iberic abbot and saint (approximate date)

== Deaths ==
- July 11 – Anthemius, emperor of the Western Roman Empire
- August 18 – Ricimer, de facto ruler of the Western Roman Empire
- Ming Di, Chinese emperor of the Liu Song dynasty (b. 439)
- Olybrius, emperor of the Western Roman Empire
