= 455 (disambiguation) =

455 may refer to:

- Cubana Flight 455
- The year 455
- British Rail Class 455, a British EMU train
- Ginza stop, station code

== See also ==
- 455th (disambiguation)
