= 439th =

439th may refer to:

- 439th (Tyne) Light Air Defence Regiment, Royal Artillery, a Volunteer unit of the British Army
- 439th Airlift Wing, an active United States Air Force Reserve unit
- 439th Bombardment Squadron, a B-26 Marauder medium bombardment unit
- 439th Operations Group, an active United States Air Force Reserve unit

== See also ==
- 439 (number)
- 439, the year 439 (CDXXXIX) of the Julian calendar
- 439 BC
