= 439 =

439 in various calendars
Gregorian calendar	439; CDXXXIX
Ab urbe condita	1192
Assyrian calendar	5189
Balinese saka calendar	360–361
Bengali calendar	−155 – −154
Berber calendar	1389
Buddhist calendar	983
Burmese calendar	−199
Byzantine calendar	5947–5948
Chinese calendar	戊寅年 (Earth Tiger); 3136 or 2929 — to — 己卯年 (Earth Rabbit); 3137 or 2930
Coptic calendar	155–156
Discordian calendar	1605
Ethiopian calendar	431–432
Hebrew calendar	4199–4200
- Hindu calendars
Vikram Samvat	495–496
Shaka Samvat	360–361
Kali Yuga	3539–3540
Holocene calendar	10439
Iranian calendar	183 BP – 182 BP
Islamic calendar	189 BH – 188 BH
Javanese calendar	323–324
Julian calendar	439; CDXXXIX
Korean calendar	2772
Minguo calendar	1473 before ROC 民前1473年
Nanakshahi calendar	−1029
Seleucid era	750/751 AG
Thai solar calendar	981–982
Tibetan calendar	ས་ཕོ་སྟག་ལོ་ (male Earth-Tiger); 565 or 184 or −588 — to — ས་མོ་ཡོས་ལོ་ (female Earth-Hare); 566 or 185 or −587

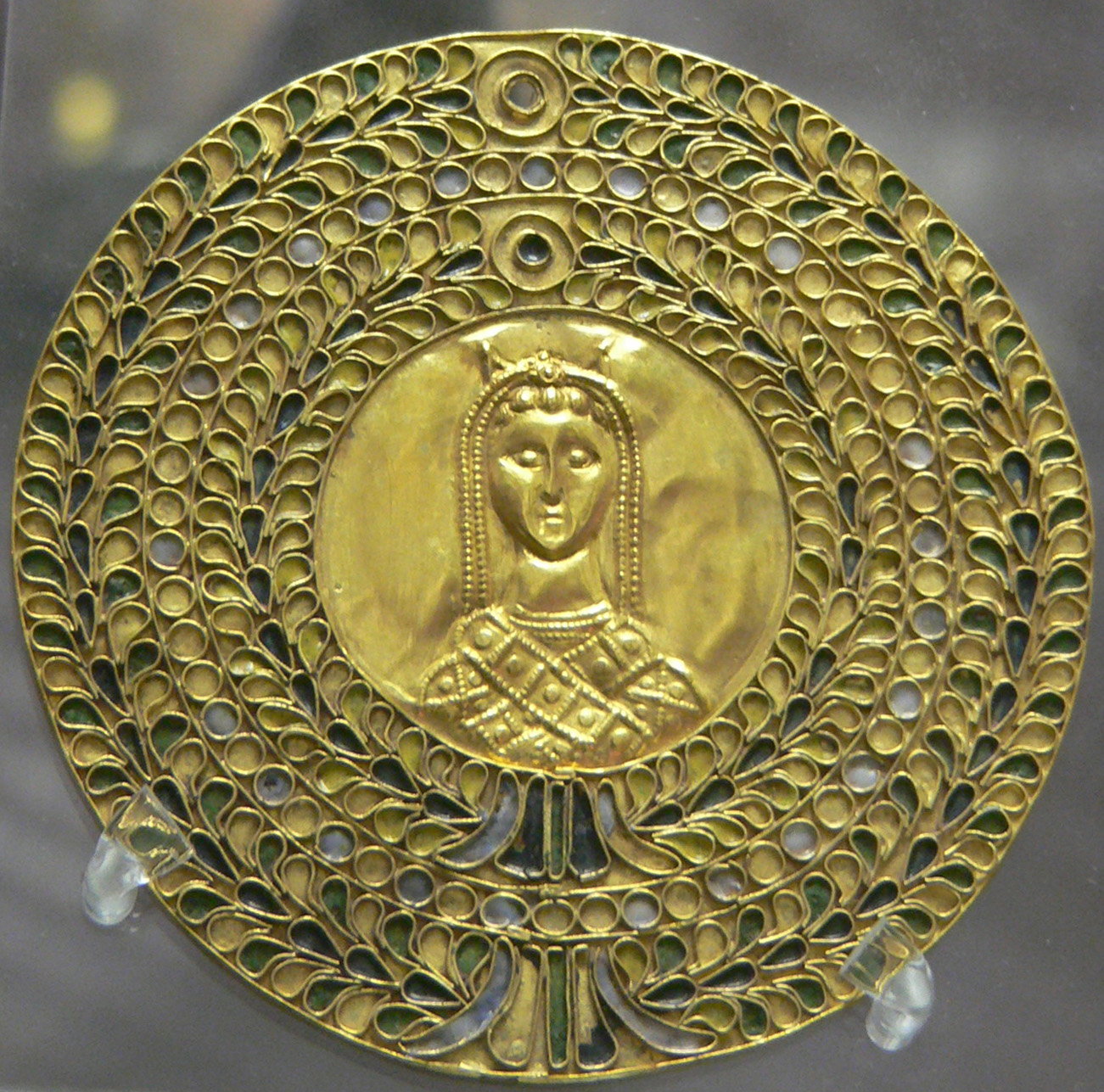
Empress Licinia Eudoxia

Year 439 (CDXXXIX) was a common year starting on Sunday of the Julian calendar. At the time, it was known as the Year of the Consulship of Theodosius and Festus (or, less frequently, year 1192 Ab urbe condita). The denomination 439 for this year has been used since the early medieval period, when the Anno Domini calendar era became the prevalent method in Europe for naming years.

== Events ==
=== By place ===
==== Europe ====
- Battle of Guoloph: Vitalinus (possibly Vortigern) is defeated at the hands of Ambrosius Aurelianus, and a combined force of Romano-British forces from across southern Britain.
- Gothic War (436-439): Litorius, Roman general (Magister militum per Gallias), lays siege to Toulouse. During the decisive battle before the walls he suffers a severe defeat and is killed, and only the heavy loss of Visigoths makes King Theodoric I decide to agree to a provisional restoration of the status quo.
- Licinia Eudoxia, wife of emperor Valentinian III, is granted the title of Augusta following the birth of their daughter Eudocia.

==== Byzantium ====
- Winter – Hun and Roman envoys meet at Margum (modern Bosnia and Herzegovina), an important market town on the Sava River. After negotiations, Attila and his brother Bleda, who are present, accept a four-point peace plan. Trading rights between the two states are confirmed and emperor Theodosius II pays an annual tribute of 700 pounds of gold.

==== Africa ====
- Vandal War (439-442): King Genseric breaks his treaty with the Western Roman Empire and invades Africa Proconsularis.
- October 19 – Carthage falls to the Vandals. Genseric makes it his capital and establishes the Vandal Kingdom.
- The Vandals establish a North African granary that enables them to enforce their will on other nations, who are dependent on North Africa for grain and other food staples.

==== Asia ====
- The Northern Wei empire annexes Northern Liang and unifies Northern China, concluding the Sixteen Kingdoms era.

=== By topic ===
==== Religion ====
- Isaac the Great, Armenian apostolic patriarch, dies at Ashtishat. He helped to develop a Greek-inspired alphabet, and translate the Bible, along with various Christian writings, into Armenian.
- The Historia Ecclesiastica of Socrates of Constantinople is concluded, perhaps due to the author's death.
- The monastery of Mar Saba is founded near Bethlehem (Palestine).

== Births ==
- Eudocia, Vandal queen and daughter of Valentinian III
- Ming Di, emperor of the Liu Song Dynasty (d. 472)
- Sabbas the Sanctified, Christian monk and saint (d. 532)

== Deaths ==
- Isaac, patriarch of Armenia (b. 338)
- Litorius, general of the Western Roman Empire
- Sima Maoying, empress of the Liu Song Dynasty (b. 393)
- Spearthrower Owl, ruler of Teotihuacan (Mexico)
