= Battle of Mérida (428) =

428 battle between the Suebi and the Vandals

Date	428
Location	Emerita Augusta
Result	Vandal-Alanian victory

Belligerents
Suebi	Kingdom of the Vandals and Alans

Commanders and leaders
Heremigarius †	Genseric

The Battle of Mérida was fought between the Suebi and the Vandals at modern Mérida, Spain, in 428. The battle took place while the Vandals were stationed in southern Spain under the leadership of Genseric and were preparing to invade Africa. The Suebi had previously captured Gallaecia and were expanding into Lusitania. Under their leader Heremigarius, the Suebi decided to attack the Vandals. At Mérida the Suebi suffered a devastating defeat, and their king Heremigarius drowned while fleeing across the Guadiana. Genseric subsequently crossed into Africa, capturing Hippo Regius in August 431.
