= Gaudentius (son of Aëtius) =

Son of Roman general Aetius (born c. 440)

Gaudentius (c. 440 in Rome – after 455) was the son of Flavius Aetius. F. M. Clover has argued that his mother was Pelagia, a Gothic noblewoman and the widow of Bonifacius.

He was born in Rome, probably in 440, and was baptized before his first birthday. Scholars identify him as the unnamed subject of a poem of Flavius Merobaudes. In 454 his father and emperor Valentinian III arranged a marriage alliance, which included the marriage between Gaudentius and Placidia, but that year his father was killed by Valentinian himself. In 455, the Vandals sacked Rome; Gaudentius was one of the countless thousands made a prisoner and brought back to Africa. Gaiseric claimed that his following attacks to Italy were to recover Gaudentius's legacy.
