= 393 =

393 in various calendars
- Gregorian calendar: 393; CCCXCIII
- Ab urbe condita: 1146
- Assyrian calendar: 5143
- Balinese saka calendar: 314–315
- Bengali calendar: −201 – −200
- Berber calendar: 1343
- Buddhist calendar: 937
- Burmese calendar: −245
- Byzantine calendar: 5901–5902
- Chinese calendar: 壬辰年 (Water Dragon); 3090 or 2883 — to — 癸巳年 (Water Snake); 3091 or 2884
- Coptic calendar: 109–110
- Discordian calendar: 1559
- Ethiopian calendar: 385–386
- Hebrew calendar: 4153–4154
- Hindu calendars
- Vikram Samvat: 449–450
- Shaka Samvat: 314–315
- Kali Yuga: 3493–3494
- Holocene calendar: 10393
- Iranian calendar: 229 BP – 228 BP
- Islamic calendar: 236 BH – 235 BH
- Javanese calendar: 276–277
- Julian calendar: 393; CCCXCIII
- Korean calendar: 2726
- Minguo calendar: 1519 before ROC 民前1519年
- Nanakshahi calendar: −1075
- Seleucid era: 704/705 AG
- Thai solar calendar: 935–936
- Tibetan calendar: ཆུ་ཕོ་འབྲུག་ལོ་ (male Water-Dragon); 519 or 138 or −634 — to — ཆུ་མོ་སྦྲུལ་ལོ་ (female Water-Snake); 520 or 139 or −633

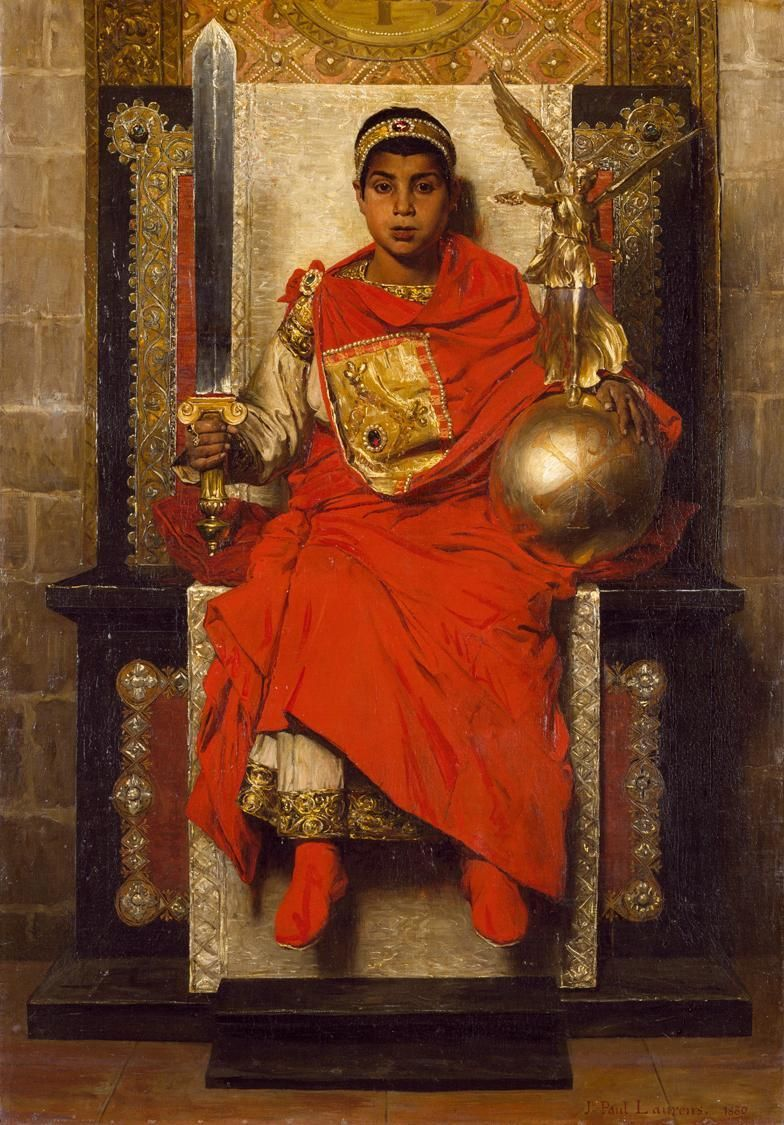
Emperor Honorius, by Jean-Paul Laurens

Year 393 (CCCXCIII) was a common year starting on Saturday of the Julian calendar. At the time, it was known as the Year of the Consulship of Augustus and Augustus (or, less frequently, year 1146 Ab urbe condita). The denomination 393 for this year has been used since the early medieval period, when the Anno Domini calendar era became the prevalent method in Europe for naming years.

== Events ==
=== By place ===
==== Roman Empire ====
- January 23 – Emperor Theodosius I proclaims his son Honorius, age 8, co-ruler (Augustus) of the Western Roman Empire.
- Theodosius I demands the destruction of pagan temples, holy sites, and ancient objects throughout the Roman Empire.
- Theodosius I abolishes the Greek Olympic Games, ending a thousand years of festivals, as part of the general Christian policy to establish universal Christian worship in accordance with the doctrines set forth in the Nicene Creed (the next Olympic Games will not be held until 1896).

==== China ====
- Yao Xing succeeds Yao Chang as emperor of the Later Qin Empire.
- Chinese astronomers observe the guest star SN 393.

=== By topic ===
==== Religion ====
- Synod of Hippo: A council at Hippo Regius (Algeria) is hosted by the Church. The bishops approve a canon of Sacred Scripture that correspond to the Roman Catholic Church.

== Births ==
- Sima Maoying, empress of the Liu Song dynasty (d. 439)
- Theodoret of Cyrrhus, bishop and theologian (approximate date)

== Deaths ==
- Eunomius of Cyzicus, Arian bishop and theologian
- Zhai Zhao "Heavenly Prince" (Tian Wang), emperor of Wei
