= Heremigar =

Suevic military leader

- King of the Suevi
- Reign: fl. 427–428
- Predecessor: Hermeric
- Successor: Hermeric
- Died: 428

Heremigar (also Heremigarius, Hermigarius or Hermegarius) (fl. 427–428) was a Suevic military leader operating in Lusitania in the early fifth century. He may have been a joint monarch with Hermeric or his successor, but no primary source directly attests it. Writing in the mid-seventh century, Fredegar calls Heremigarius rex Suaevorum, king of the Suevi.

According to Hydatius, a contemporary source, Heremigar had attacked the Vandal-controlled cities of Seville and Mérida and committed an unspecified offence (iniuria) against the Basilica of Saint Eulalia. He was thus "cast down in the river Ana by the arm of God," where he drowned. He was in fact defeated in battle by the Vandal king Geiseric near Mérida and drowned during the retreat.

Recently, Casimiro Torres, in Galicia Sueva, argued that Heremigar was the father of the magister militum Ricimer. He has also been connected with Ermengon who is interred in an Arian tomb in the basilica of Hippo Regius, the Vandal capital. She was apparently a wealthy Suevic member of the Vandal aristocracy, perhaps a relative of Heremigar.

== Sources ==
- Gillett, Andrew. "The Birth of Ricimer." Historia: Zeitschrift für Alte Geschichte 44, 3 (1995): 380–84.
- Hughes, Ian. Gaiseric: The Vandal Who Destroyed Rome. Pen & Sword, 2017.
- Muhlberger, Steve. Overview of Late Antiquity. ORB Online Encyclopedia. 1996.
- Shwarz, Andreas. "The Settlement of the Vandals in North Africa." Andrew H. Merrills, ed., Vandals, Romans and Berbers: New Perspectives on Late Antique North Africa (pp. 49–58). Ashgate Publishing, 2004. ISBN 0-7546-4145-7.
- Thompson, E. A. Romans and Barbarians: The Decline of the Western Empire. Madison: University of Wisconsin Press, 1982. ISBN 0-299-08700-X.
