= Palladius (Caesar) =

Roman caesar in 455

- Caesar of the Roman Empire
- Reign: 17 March – 31 May 455 AD (under Petronius Maximus)
- Born: c.415/425 AD
- Died: 31 May 455 (aged 30–40); Rome
- Spouse: Eudocia
- Father: Petronius Maximus
- Mother: possibly Eparchia

Palladius (c. 415/425 – May 455) was caesar of the Western Roman Empire for two months in 455. He was born between 415 and 425 AD and may have held the position of Praetorian Prefect during the 450's. After his father, Petronius Maximus, assassinated Emperor Valentinian III and seized power, Palladius became heir-apparent with the title of caesar. His marriage to Valentinian’s daughter Eudocia broke a pre-existing treaty in which Eudocia had been promised as a wife for Huneric, son of the Vandal king Genseric. The Vandals invaded and sacked Rome; while attempting to escape the city, Petronius Maximus and Palladius were killed by a mob of angry Romans on 31 May 455.

== History ==
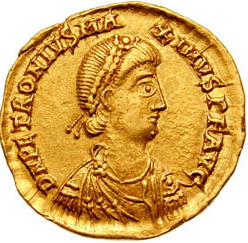
Coin bearing the image of Petronius Maximus, Palladius' father.

Palladius was born between 415 and 425 AD. His father was the extremely wealthy senator Petronius Maximus, who had held numerous public offices under Emperors Honorius and Valentinian III, including two terms as consul. According to Mommaerts and Kelley, Palladius' mother was Eparchia, sister of Avitus. Palladius may have been a Praetorian Prefect at some point during the 450's.

Maximus became the Western Roman Emperor on 17 March 455, after assassinating Valentinian III. Palladius was elevated to caesar, or designated heir, and married to Valentinian's daughter Eudocia. Along with Maximus' marriage to Licinia Eudoxia, Valentinian's former wife, these acts were intended to link the new emperors to the Theodosian dynasty, and create a sense of stability and continuity for a regime which had begun in violence.

While negotiating a treaty with Genseric, the king of the Vandals, Valentinian had offered a similar political marriage between Eudocia and Huneric, Genseric's son. Declaring the treaty violated, Genseric assembled a fleet to lead an expedition to Rome. Maximus' failure to make any preparations led the nobles to flee the city of Rome en masse, but lower-class inhabitants were not allowed to leave without governmental permission. As the Vandal fleet approached Rome, Maximus gave the order that any person wishing to leave could do so. On 31 May Maximus and Palladius themselves attempted to escape from Rome, but were intercepted by a mob of angry peasants. Ancient sources agree that both men were killed, but differ as to specifics. One account states that Maximus and Palladius were killed by their own palace servants, who were probably trying to win the favor of the rioting peasants. A second account attributes their deaths directly to the mob, who drove the emperors off their horses with a shower of stones, then tore them apart.

Very little is recorded of Maximus and Palladius' shared rule. Ferdinand Gregorovius says that the marriages of Maximus and Palladius and the elevation of Palladius to caesar were the only significant actions of their c. 77 day reign. No coins were minted bearing Palladius' portrait, and among contemporary historians he is mentioned only by Hydatius.
