= Paterius (consul 443) =

Flavius Paterius was a politician of the Roman Empire; he was made consul for 443 as the junior partner of Petronius Maximus.

He was a praetorian prefect of Italy on September 27, 442.

== Bibliography ==
- Martindale, John R.; Jones, A.H.M.; Morris, J. (1980). The Prosopography of the Later Roman Empire: A.D. 395-527. Cambridge University Press. p. 836. ISBN 0-521-20159-4.

Political offices
Preceded by Eudoxius; Dioscorus	Roman consul 443 with Petronius Maximus II	Succeeded by Theodosius Augustus XVIII; Caecina Decius Aginatius Albinus
