= Samuel Dill =

Irish-born classical scholar, historian and educationalist (1844–1924)

Sir Samuel Dill (26 March 1844 – 26 May 1924) was an Irish-born classical scholar, historian, and educationalist.

== Life ==
He was born on 26 March 1844, the eldest son of Rev. Marcus Dill, DD, presbyterian minister of Hillsborough, and Anna Dill (née Moreland).

He was educated at the Geneva Theological College, and at Queen's College, Belfast, taking a degree in arts in 1864.

Dill wrote a number of histories of Roman culture and religion, including Roman Society from Nero to Marcus Aurelius, Roman Society in the Last Century of the Western Empire, and Roman Society in Gaul in the Merovingian Age.

He died on 26 May 1924.

== Family ==
He married (1884) Fanny Elizabeth Morgan of Shrewsbury, Shropshire, England; they had three daughters.

His cousin was the Church of Scotland minister Samuel Marcus Dill.
