= Placidia =

Roman empress
- Tenure: 11 July – 2 November 472
- Born: 439–443; Rome
- Died: c. 484 (aged 41–45); Constantinople
- Spouse: Olybrius
- Issue: Anicia Juliana
- Dynasty: Theodosian; Valentinianic
- Father: Valentinian III
- Mother: Licinia Eudoxia

Placidia (Latin: [plaˈkɪdɪ.a]) was a 5th-century Roman noblewoman and briefly empress in the Western Roman Empire. Her father was Valentinian III, Roman emperor in the West from 425 to 455. In 455, shortly after her marriage to Olybrius, she was captured by Gaiseric and spent six or seven years as a hostage of the Vandal Kingdom. At the end of this period Placidia was ransomed back to Constantinople, where she remained during Olybrius's few months as western Roman emperor in 472. She was one of the last imperial spouses in the Roman west, during the Fall of the Western Roman Empire in Late Antiquity.

== Family ==
Placidia is estimated to have been born between 439 and 443, the second daughter of Valentinian III and Licinia Eudoxia. Her elder sister, Eudocia, later married Huneric, son of Gaiseric, king of the Vandals. Both sisters were named for their grandmothers: Eudocia for the maternal, Aelia Eudocia, and Placidia for the paternal, Galla Placidia.

== Marriage ==
In 454 or 455, Placidia married Anicius Olybrius, a member of the Anicii family, a prominent family with known members active in both Italia and Gaul. The exact relation of Olybrius to other members of the family is not known as his parents are not named in primary sources. Several theories exist as to their identity.

Originally Emperor Valentinian intended to marry Placidia to a young man named Majorian (the future emperor), whom Oost describes as having "distinguished himself in a subaltern capacity fighting in Gaul against the Franks under Aëtius' own command." Doing so, according to Roman customs, would instantly link Majorian to the Imperial family and put him in line to succeed Valentinian. Once Flavius Aetius learned of this plan, he rusticated Majorian to his estates at some date before 451, and he was recalled to Rome only after Aetius' death. Aetius also attempted to consolidate his position "by compelling the Emperor to swear to friendship with him and to agree to betroth Placidia to his own younger son Gaudentius."

Mommaerts and Kelley have proposed a theory that Petronius Maximus, the successor of Valentinian III on the Western Roman throne in 455, was behind the marriage of Placidia to Olybrius. They argue that Olybrius was likely a son of Petronius Maximus himself, reasoning that Petronius, once on the throne, would be unlikely to promote distant relatives as potential successors. According to Hydatius, Petronius arranged the marriage of his eldest stepdaughter Eudocia to Palladius, his eldest son and Caesar. They suggest that he followed suit in arranging the marriage of Placidia to one of his own younger sons, thus making the marriage of Placidia and Olybrius the third marriage between a member of the Theodosian dynasty and a member of the extended Anicii family within the same year.

== Vandal captivity ==
According to the chronicler Malchus, "Around this time, the empress Eudoxia, the widow of the emperor Valentinian and the daughter of the emperor Theodosius and Eudocia, remained unhappily at Rome and, enraged at the tyrant Maximus because of the murder of her spouse, she summoned the Vandal Gaiseric, king of Africa, against Maximus, who was ruling Rome. He came suddenly to Rome with his forces and captured the city, and having destroyed Maximus and all his forces, he took everything from the palace, even the bronze statues. He even led away as captives surviving senators, accompanied by their wives; along with them he also carried off to Carthage in Africa the empress Eudoxia, who had summoned him; her daughter Placidia, the wife of the patrician Olybrius, who then was staying at Constantinople; and even the maiden Eudocia. After he had returned, Gaiseric gave the younger Eudocia, a maiden, the daughter of the empress Eudoxia, to his son Huneric in marriage, and he held them both, the mother and the daughter, in great honor" (Chron. 366). Olybrius was in Constantinople at the time of the siege of Rome, as noted by John Malalas. He was separated from his wife for the duration of her captivity. He reportedly visited Daniel the Stylite who predicted that Eudoxia and Placidia would return.

== Empress ==
Priscus and John of Antioch report that Gaiseric entertained the idea of placing Olybrius on the throne of the Western Roman Empire, at least as early as the death of Majorian in 461. Due to his marriage to Placidia, Olybrius could be considered both an heir to the Theodosian dynasty and a member of the Vandal royal family through marriage. In 465, Libius Severus died and Gaiseric again promoted Olybrius as his candidate for the Western throne. Procopius reported that Olybrius maintained a decent relationship with his Vandal supporter.

According to the accounts of Priscus, Procopius, John Malalas, Theodorus Lector, Evagrius Scholasticus, Theophanes the Confessor, Joannes Zonaras and Cedrenus, Placidia can be estimated to have stayed a prisoner in Carthage for six to seven years. In 461 or 462, Leo I, Eastern Roman Emperor, paid a large ransom for Eudoxia and Placidia. Placidia seems to have spent the rest of her life in Constantinople.

In 472, the Western Roman Emperor Anthemius was involved in a civil war with his magister militum and son-in-law Ricimer. According to John Malalas, Leo decided to intervene and send Olybrius to quell the hostilities. Warned that Leo was planning to betray him, Olybrius instead entered an alliance with Ricimer, opening a civil war which ended in the death of Anthemius and Olybrius' accession as Western Emperor. Placidia became Western Empress without actually visiting the west, remaining in Constantinople with their daughter. On 22 October or 2 November of the same year, Olybrius himself died. John of Antioch attributes his death to dropsy, while Cassiodorus and Magnus Felix Ennodius report the death without noting a cause. All report on how brief the reign was.

Malchus reports that, in 478, "ambassadors came to Byzantium from Carthage, under the leadership of Alexander, the guardian of Olybrius' wife [sc. Placidia]. He formerly had been sent there by Zeno with the agreement of Placidia herself. The ambassadors said that Huneric had honestly set himself up as a friend of the emperor, and so loved all things Roman that he renounced everything that he had formerly claimed from the public revenues and also the other moneys that Leo had earlier seized from his wife [sc. Eudocia]... He gave thanks that the emperor had honored the wife of Olybrius..." Placidia is last mentioned c. 484.

Placidia was probably the last Western Roman Empress whose name is still known. Glycerius and Romulus Augustus are not known to have been married. Julius Nepos had married a niece of Verina and Leo I, whose name is not mentioned in surviving records.

== Children ==
Her only known child and daughter was Anicia Juliana, born c. 462, who spent her life at the pre-Justinian court of Constantinople. Juliana was considered "both the most aristocratic and the wealthiest inhabitant". Oost comments that "through her the descendants of Galla Placidia [Placidia's grandmother] were among the nobility of the Eastern Empire."

Royal titles
Preceded by Marcia Euphemia	Western Roman Empress consort 472	Succeeded by Julius Nepos's wife
