= Petronius Maximus =

Western Roman emperor in 455

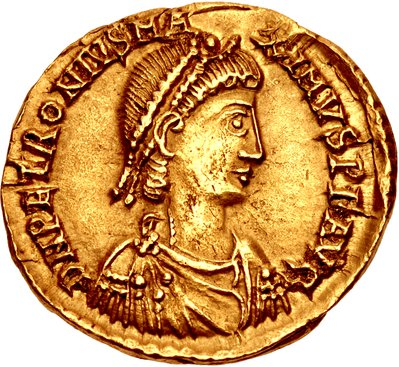
- Solidus of Petronius Maximus marked: d·n· petronius maximus p·f· aug·

Roman emperor in the West
- Reign: 17 March – 31 May 455
- Predecessor: Valentinian III
- Successor: Avitus
- Eastern emperor: Marcian
- Born: c. 397
- Died: 31 May 455 (aged c. 58); Rome, Roman Italy, Western Roman Empire
- Spouse: Eparchia; Lucina; Licinia Eudoxia
- Issue: Palladius
- Father: Possibly Anicius Probinus

Petronius Maximus (c. 397 – 31 May 455) was Roman emperor of the West for two and a half months in 455. A wealthy senator and a prominent aristocrat, he was instrumental in the murders of the Western Roman magister militum, Aëtius, and the Western Roman emperor, Valentinian III.

After the assassination of Aëtius and the subsequent death of Valentinian III, Maximus secured the support of the Senate and utilized bribery to gain the favor of palace officials, enabling him to ascend to power. He strengthened his position by forcing Licinia Eudoxia, Valentinian's widow, to marry him and forcing her daughter Eudocia to marry his son, cancelling her betrothal to the son of the Vandal king Genseric. This infuriated both Eudocia and Genseric, who sent a fleet to Rome. Maximus failed to obtain troops from the Visigoths and he fled as the Vandals arrived, became detached from his retinue and bodyguard in the confusion, and was killed by fellow Romans. The Vandals thoroughly sacked Rome in their retaliatory invasion.

The reign of Petronius Maximus marked a significant period of instability and decline for the Western Roman Empire. His brief and controversial rule reflected the political fragmentation and lack of centralized authority that plagued the empire during its final years. The invasion and sacking of Rome by the Vandals underlined the growing vulnerability of the Western Roman Empire, which would ultimately culminate in its collapse in 476.

== Early career ==
Petronius Maximus was born about 397. Although he was of obscure origin, it is believed that he belonged to the Anicius and Petronius families. Related to the later Emperor Olybrius, Maximus was the son of Anicius Probinus, and the grandson of Anicia Faltonia Proba and Sextus Claudius Petronius Probus, who was prefect of Illyricum in 364, prefect of Gaul in 366, prefect of Italy from 368 to 375 and again in 383 and consul in 371. Procopius claimed that he was a descendant of Emperor Magnus Maximus, but historians such as J. B. Bury consider this account "untrustworthy and improbable".

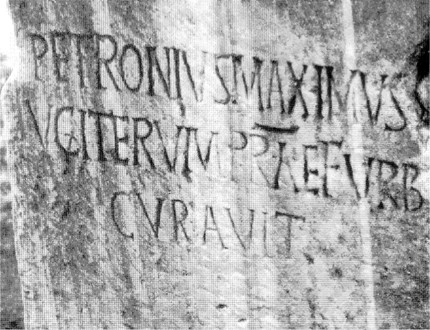
The base of a statue featuring the name of Petronius Maximus. This statue was restored by him during his second time as urban prefect.

Maximus had a remarkable early career. His earliest known office was praetor, held in about 411; around 415 he served as a tribunus et notarius, which was an entry position to the imperial bureaucracy and led to his serving as comes sacrarum largitionum (count of the sacred largess) between 416 and 419. Maximus spent 4,000 gold librae on public games in 412 or 415. From January or February 420 to August or September 421, he served as praefectus urbi of Rome, granting him executive authority for much of the municipal administration of Rome; he held the office again sometime before 439. During his tenure as praefectus, he undertook the restoration of the Old St. Peter's Basilica. Additionally, he was also appointed praetorian prefect, a leading military and judicial position, sometime between 421 and 439. It was either while holding this post or during his second urban prefecture that he was appointed consul for the year 433. Attaining the position of consul was considered the highest honor in the Roman state.

From 28 August 439 to 14 March 441, Maximus held the praetorian prefecture of Italy, the most important administrative and judicial non-imperial position in the Western Empire, and succeeded in that office by Anicius Acilius Glabrio Faustus. He was awarded a second consulship in 443. In 445, he was granted the title of patrician, the empire's senior honorific title, which was limited to a very small number of holders. During this year he was briefly the most honoured of all non-imperial Romans until the third consulate of Flavius Aëtius, generalissimo, or magister militum, of the Western Empire, the following year. Between 443 and 445 Maximus built a forum, the Forum Petronii Maximi, in Rome, on the Caelian Hill between the via Labicana and the Basilica di San Clemente.

== Murder of Valentinian III and accession of Maximus ==
According to the historian John of Antioch, Maximus poisoned the mind of the Emperor against Aëtius, resulting in the murder of his rival at the hands of Valentinian III. John's account has it that Valentinian and Maximus placed a wager on a game that Maximus ended up losing. As he did not have the money available, Maximus left his ring as a guarantee of his debt. Valentinian then used the ring to summon to court Lucina, the chaste and beautiful wife of Maximus, whom Valentinian had long lusted after. Lucina went to the court, believing she had been summoned by her husband, but instead found herself at dinner with Valentinian. Although she initially resisted his advances, the Emperor managed to wear her down and succeeded in raping her. Returning home and meeting Maximus, she accused him of betrayal, believing that he had handed her over to the Emperor. Although Maximus swore revenge, he was equally motivated by ambition to supplant "a detested and despicable rival", so he decided to move against Valentinian.

According to John of Antioch, Maximus was acutely aware that while Aëtius was alive he could not exact vengeance on Valentinian, so Aëtius had to be removed. He therefore allied himself with a eunuch of Valentinian's, the primicerius sacri cubiculi Heraclius, who had long opposed the general, with the hope of exercising more power over the emperor. The two of them convinced Valentinian that Aëtius was planning to assassinate him and urged him to kill his magister militum during a meeting, which Valentinian did with his own hands, with the help of Heraclius, on 21 September 454.

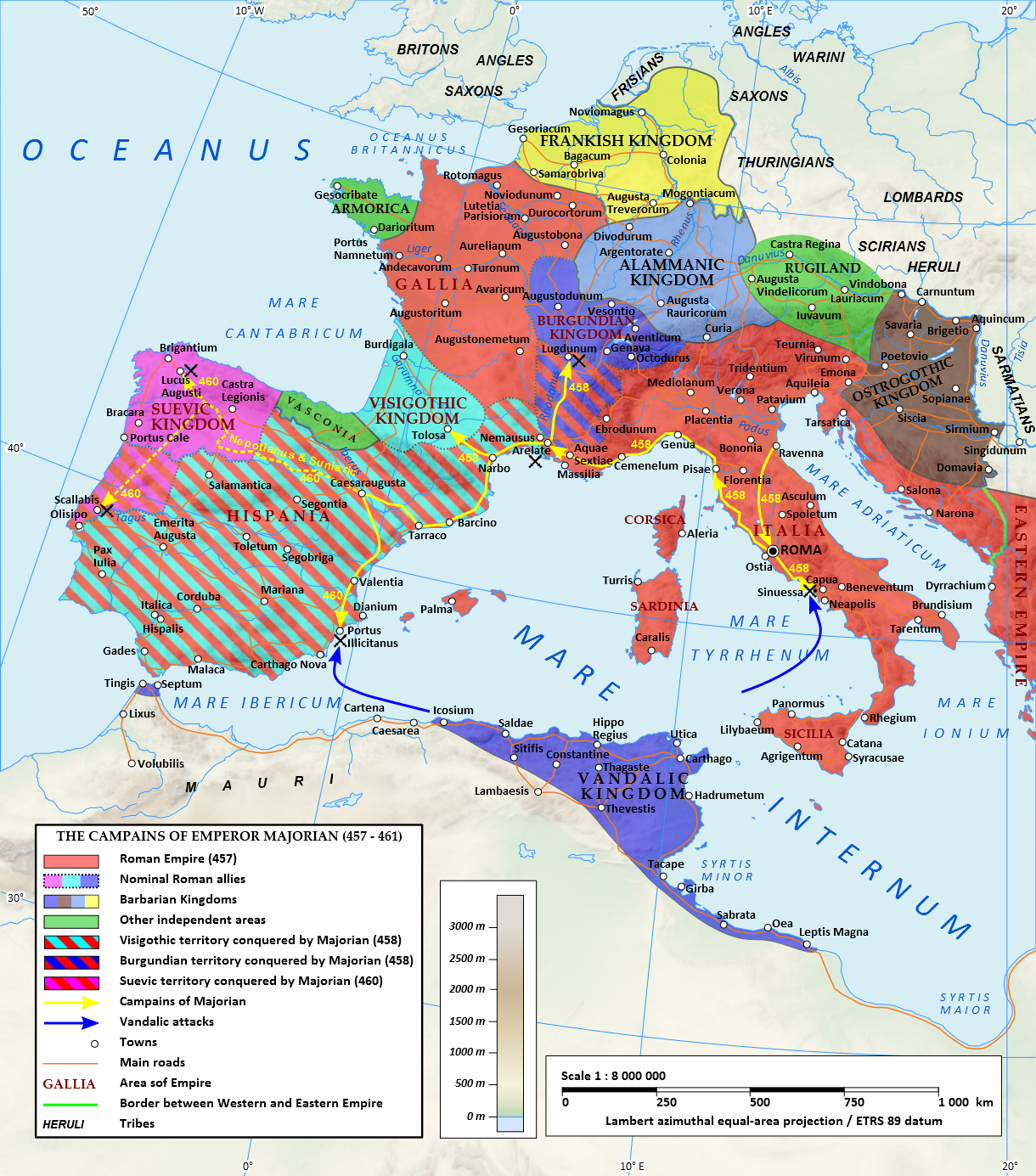
The Western Roman Empire at about this period, in red only

Once Aëtius was dead, Maximus asked Valentinian for Aëtius's now-vacant position, but the Emperor refused; Moreover, Heraclius had advised the Emperor not to allow anyone to possess the power that Aëtius had wielded. According to John of Antioch, Maximus was so irritated by Valentinian's refusal to appoint him as his magister militum that he decided to have Valentinian assassinated as well. He chose as accomplices Optilia and Thraustila, two Scythians who had fought under the command of Aetius and who, after the death of their general, had been appointed as Valentinian's escort.

Maximus easily convinced them that Valentinian was the only one responsible for the death of Aetius, and that the two soldiers must avenge their old commander, while at the same time also promising them a reward for the betrayal of the Emperor. On 16 March 455 Valentinian, who was in Rome, went to Campus Martius with some guards, accompanied by Optilia, Thraustila and their men. As soon as the Emperor dismounted to practice with the bow, Optilia came up with his men and stabbed him in the temple. As Valentinian turned to look at his attacker, Optila finished him off with another thrust of his blade. At the same moment, Thraustila killed Heraclius. The two Scythians took the imperial diadem and robe and brought them to Maximus.

The sudden and violent death of Valentinian III left the Western Roman Empire without an obvious successor to the throne. Several candidates were supported by various groups of the imperial bureaucracy and the military. In particular, the army's support was split among three main candidates: Maximianus, the former domesticus (bodyguard) of Aëtius, who was the son of an Egyptian merchant named Domninus who had become rich in Italy; the future emperor Majorian, who commanded the army after the death of Aetius and who had the backing of the Empress Licinia Eudoxia; and Maximus himself, who had the support of the Roman Senate and who secured the throne on 17 March by distributing money to the officials of the imperial palace.

== Reign and death ==
After gaining control of the royal palace, Maximus consolidated his hold on power by immediately marrying Licinia Eudoxia, the widow of Valentinian. She married him reluctantly, suspecting that he had been involved in the murder of her late husband; and indeed Maximus treated Valentinian III's assassins with considerable favour. The eastern court at Constantinople refused to recognise his accession. To further secure his position Maximus quickly appointed Avitus as magister militum and sent him on a mission to Toulouse to gain the support of the Visigoths. He also proceeded to cancel the betrothal of Licinia's daughter, Eudocia, to Huneric, the son of the Vandal king Geiseric, and married her to his own son. Again he anticipated that this would further his and his family's imperial credentials. This repudiation infuriated the Vandal king, who only needed the excuse of Licinia's despairing appeal to the Vandal court to begin preparations for the invasion of Italy.

By May, within two months of Maximus gaining the throne, news reached Rome that Geiseric was sailing for Italy. As the news spread, panic gripped the city and many of its inhabitants took to flight. The Emperor, aware that Avitus had not yet returned with the expected Visigothic aid, decided that it was fruitless to mount a defence against the Vandals. So he attempted to organise his escape, urging the Senate to accompany him. However, in the panic, Petronius Maximus was abandoned by his bodyguard and entourage and left to fend for himself.

As Maximus rode out of the city on his own on 31 May 455, he was set upon by an angry mob, who stoned him to death (another account has it that he was killed by "a certain Roman soldier named Ursus"). His body was mutilated and flung into the Tiber. He had reigned for only 75 days. His son from his first marriage, Palladius, who had held the title of caesar between 17 March and 31 May, and who had married his stepsister Eudocia, was probably executed.

== Aftermath ==
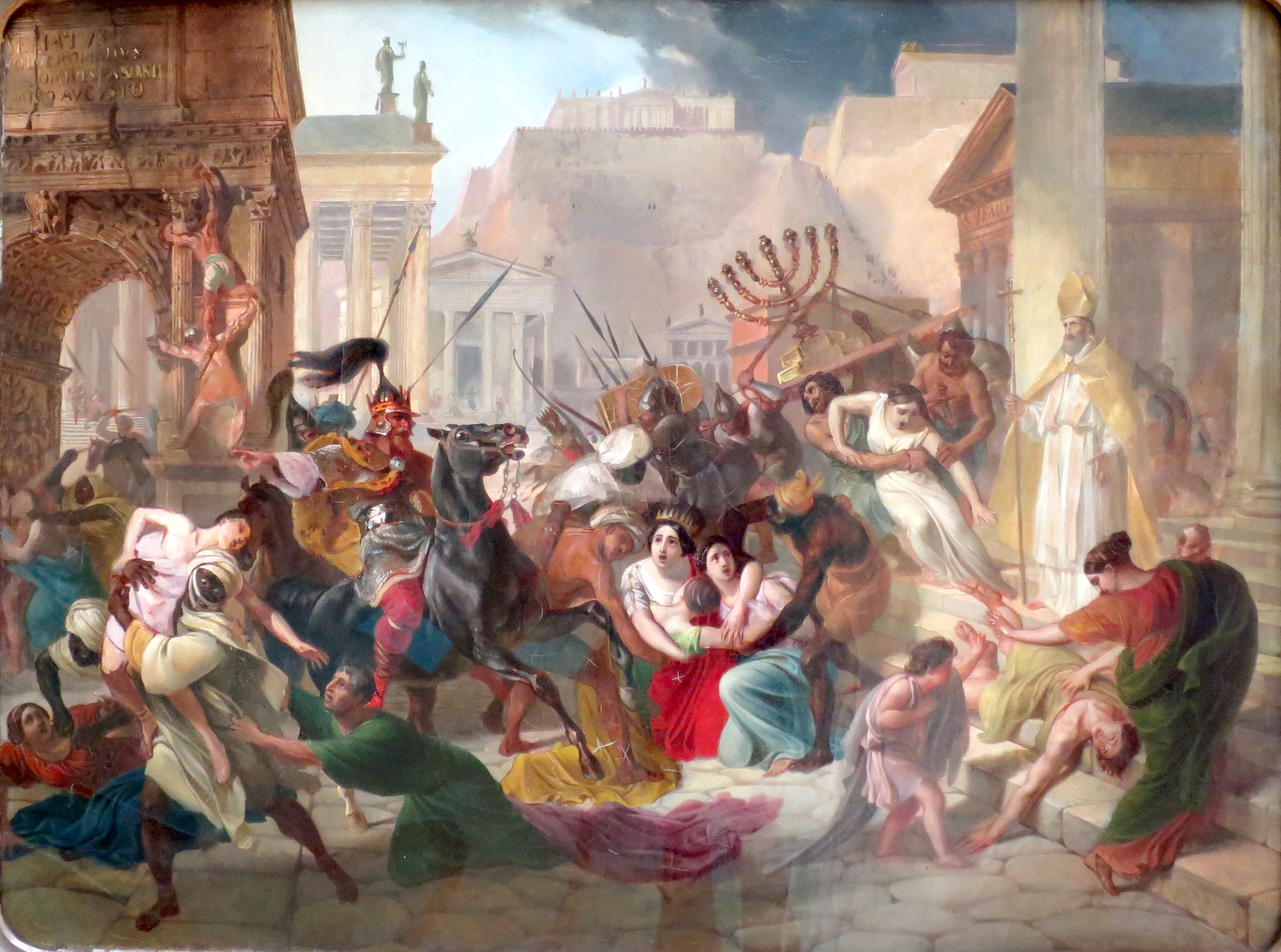
A depiction of the sack of Rome by the Vandals (by the Russian artist Karl Bryullov, painted 1835)

On 2 June 455, three days after Maximus's death, Geiseric captured the city of Rome and sacked it for two weeks. Amidst the pillaging and looting of the city, and in response to the pleas of Pope Leo I, the Vandals are said to have refrained from arson, torture, and murder. The Vandals' activities during the sack gave rise to the modern term "vandalism". Geiseric also carried away the empress Licinia Eudoxia and her daughters Placidia and Eudocia.

== See also ==
- Ancient Rome: The Rise and Fall of an Empire

== Works cited ==
=== Books ===
- Birley, Anthony (2005). The Roman Government of Britain. Oxford University Press. ISBN 9780191719103.
- Browne, Robert William (1859). A history of Rome from A.D. 96 to the fall of the Western empire. Society for Promoting Christian Knowledge. OCLC 26234691.
- Cameron, Alan (2010). The Last Pagans of Rome. Oxford University Press. ISBN 9780199866212.
- Cameron, Averil; Ward-Perkins, Bryan; Whitby, Michael (2001). "Late Antiquity: Empire and Successors, A.D. 425–600". The Cambridge Ancient History. Vol. 14. Cambridge University Press. ISBN 978-0-521-32591-2.
- Drinkwater, John; Elton, Hugh (2002). Fifth-Century Gaul: A Crisis of Identity?. Cambridge University Press. ISBN 978-0521529334.
- Gibbon, Edward (1776). The History of the Decline and Fall of the Roman Empire. Vol. I. OCLC 810900761.
- Hughes, Ian (2017). Gaiseric: The Vandal Who Destroyed Rome. Pen and Sword. ISBN 978-1-4738-9030-5.
- Jones, Arnold Hugh Martin; Martindale, John Robert (1992). The Prosopography of the Later Roman Empire. Cambridge University Press. ISBN 978-0521201599.
- Kazhdan, Aleksandr Petrovich, ed. (1991). The Oxford Dictionary of Byzantium. Vol. 3. Oxford Univ. Press. ISBN 978-0195046526.
- Lançon, Bertrand (2000). Rome in Late Antiquity: Everyday Life and Urban Change, AD 312-609. Edinburgh University Press. ISBN 9780748612390.
- Mathisen, Ralph (1999). "Petronius Maximus (17 March 455 – 22 May 455)". De Imperatoribus Romanis.
- Norwich, John Julius (1990). Byzantium: The Early Centuries. Penguin. ISBN 978-0140114478.

=== Journals ===
- Clover, Frank (1978). "The Family and Early Career of Anicius Olybrius". Historia. 27 (1). Franz Steiner Verlag: 169–96. JSTOR 4435589.
- Twyman, Briggs (1970). "Aetius and the Aristocracy". Historia. 19 (4). Franz Steiner Verlag: 480–503. JSTOR 4435155.

Regnal titles
Preceded by Valentinian III	Western Roman emperor 455	Succeeded by Avitus
Political offices
Preceded by Aetius; Valerius	Roman consul 433 with Theodosius Augustus XIV	Succeeded by Aspar; Areobindus
Preceded by Dioscorus; Eudoxius	Roman consul II; 443 with Paterius	Succeeded by Theodosius Augustus XVIII; Albinus
