= Sack of Rome (455) =

Sack of Rome by the Vandals and Alans (455)

- Part of the Fall of the Western Roman Empire and Roman–Germanic Wars
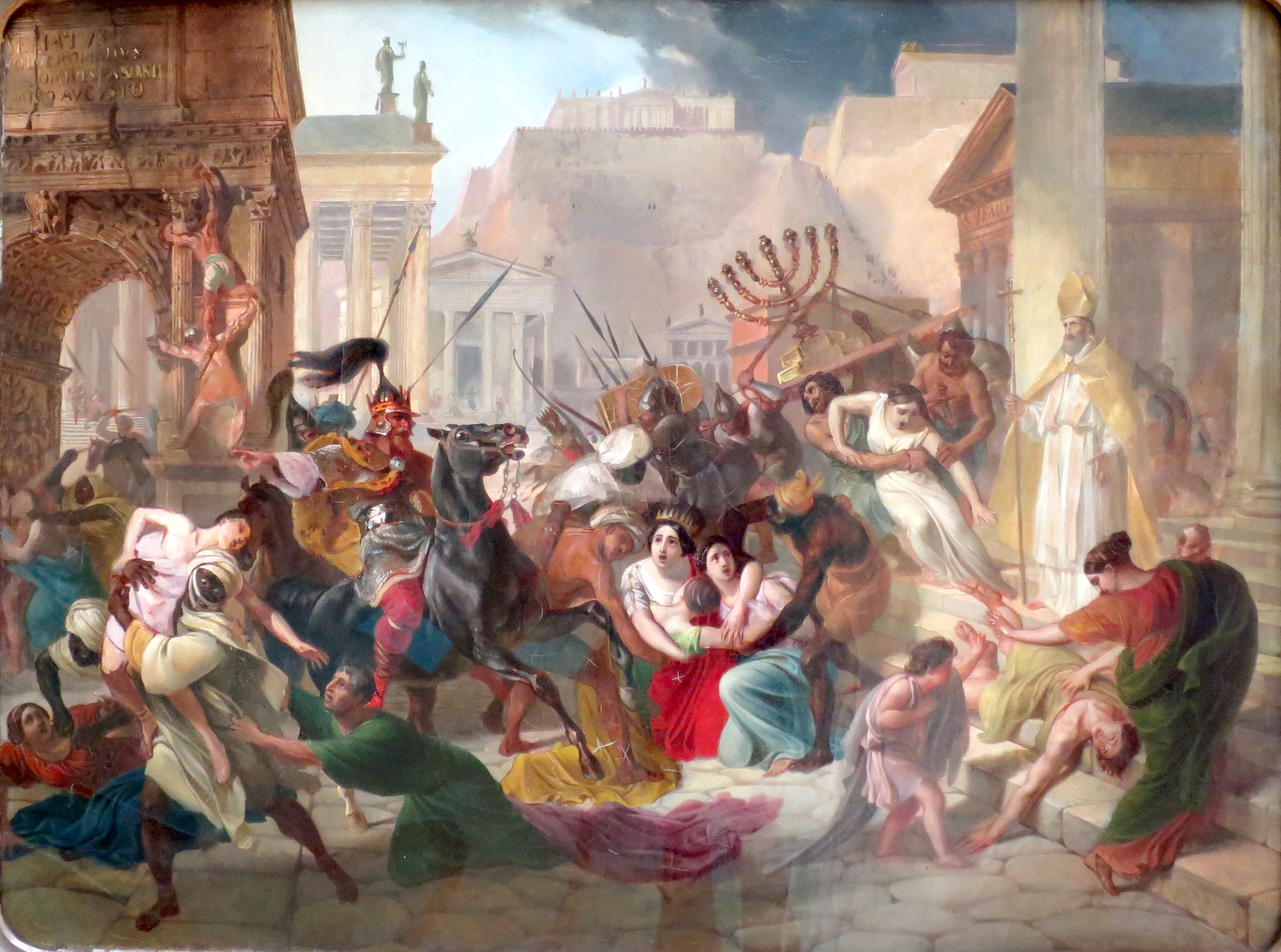
- Genseric sacking Rome, by Karl Briullov
Date	2–16 June 455
Location	Rome, Italy, Western Roman Empire (present-day Rome, Italy)
Result	Vandal-Alanian victory; Avitus appointed Western Roman Emperor; Roman civil war of 456

Belligerents
Kingdom of the Vandals and Alans	Western Roman Empire

Commanders and leaders
Gaiseric	Petronius Maximus †

The sack of Rome in 455 was carried out by the Vandals led by their king Gaiseric.

A 442 treaty between the Western Roman Empire and Vandal Kingdom included a marriage of state between the daughter of Roman Emperor Valentinian III and the son of Gaiseric. Valentinian's successor Petronius Maximus violated the treaty by marrying his son to Valentinian's daughter, and Gaiseric retaliated with an invasion of Italy. Maximus did not organise a defence of Rome and was lynched by a Roman mob while trying to escape the city. Pope Leo I convinced Gaiseric to avoid the use of violence against residents of the city. The Vandals looted Rome for two weeks, stripping it of most of its valuables and taking some residents as slaves. Maximus' successor Avitus had little support which led to the outbreak of the Roman civil war of 456.

The Sack of Rome in 455 and the Visigothic sack of 410 shocked the Roman world and symbolized the decline and impending fall of the Western Roman Empire, marking a pivotal moment in European history.

== Background ==
Since its founding in 395 AD, the Western Roman Empire was in a prolonged state of decline. One of its major issues was a mass migration of Germanic and other non-Roman peoples known as the Migration Period. This led to the sack of Rome in 410 by the Germanic Visigoths under Alaric. It was the first time the city had fallen since c. 387 BCE.

A peace treaty was signed between the Romans and Vandals in 442, in which the Vandals acquired Africa Proconsularis, Byzacena, eastern Numidia, and western Tripolitania while the Romans retained Mauretania Caesariensis, Mauretania Sitifensis, and western Numidia. A marriage alliance between Huneric and Eudocia, the daughter of Emperor Valentinian III, was also made.

Petronius Maximus is alleged to have influenced Valentinian III to have Flavius Aetius killed on 21 September 454. Maximus then conspired to have Valentinian III murdered on 16 March 455, and Maximus rose to become emperor on 17 March. Maximus, in order to legitimize his rule, married Licinia Eudoxia, the widow of Valentinian III, and married Eudocia to his son Palladius. Licinia Eudoxia, however, in revenge for her husband's murder and forced marriage, conspired with the Vandals against Maximus. Gaiseric proclaimed that the broken betrothal between Huneric and Eudocia invalidated the peace treaty and exploited the situation as a casus belli to invade Rome, gathering a large force and sailing from Carthage.

Rome had ceased to be the capital of the empire by the beginning of the 4th century and a multitude of cities served as the capital of the western empire. Theodosius I is the only emperor that is definitely known to have visited Rome between 363 and 395. Valentinian III moved his court to Rome in 450 and stayed there for the remainder of his life. The population of the city had fallen from 700,000–1,000,000 at the end of the 4th century to 300,000–500,000 by 455.

== Sack ==
The Vandals landed at Ostia, located at the mouth of the Tiber only a few miles southwest of Rome. Maximus tried to flee Rome, but was spotted by an angry mob and stoned to death before being thrown into the Tiber. Before approaching, the Vandals knocked down the aqueducts that supplied water to the city. Pope Leo I was able to convince Gaiseric to spare those who did not resist, protect buildings from fire, and to not torture captives. While Gaiseric kept his promise not to burn and slaughter, he did carry off some inhabitants as slaves, and also managed to capture Eudoxia and her daughters Eudocia and Placidia as they tried to escape.

The Vandals sacked the city for two weeks before returning to Africa, during which the imperial government of the Western Roman Empire was effectively paralysed. They marched south through Campania, devastating the region, and attempted to sack Neapolis but failed as the city had better defences.

== Aftermath ==
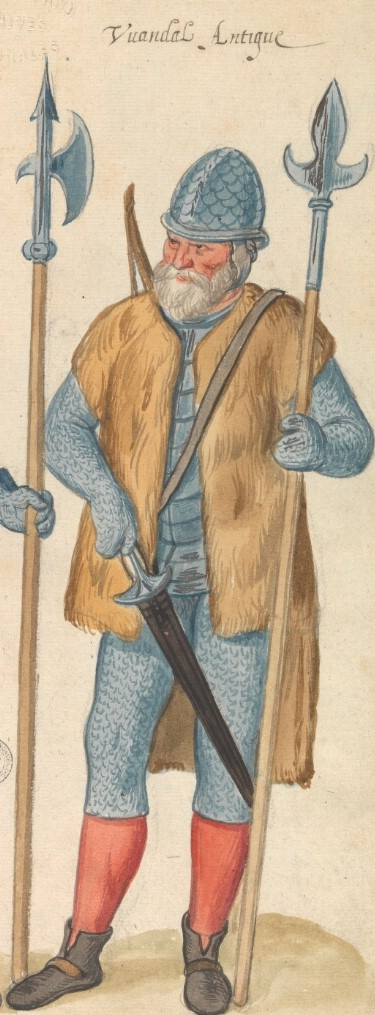
A 16th century conception of the Vandals.

Gaiseric and his army looted great amounts of treasure from Rome. They "tore off half the roof" of the Temple of Jupiter Optimus Maximus by stripping away the gilt bronze roof tiles, hence the modern term vandalism. The two-week Vandal sack of 455 is generally considered more destructive than the three-day Visigoth sack of 410. Victor of Vita records that several shiploads of slave captives arrived in Africa from Rome, who were then divided between the Vandals. Deogratias, the Bishop of Carthage, bought the freedom of some of the Romans by selling all of the valuables from his church. Deogratias hosted and fed them in larger churches in Carthage until they could be repatriated back to Rome.

Avitus, who had the military and financial support of King Theodoric II, was acclaimed emperor by his army in Arles on 9–10 July, and was later recognized by the Roman Senate. He was later overthrown by Majorian and Ricimer after a civil war in 456. Avitus allowed the Visigoths to enter Suebian-controlled Hispania in return for Theodoric's support. Avitus was popular with the Germanic elites, but he proved to be unpopular with the Roman aristocracy and struggled to gain control of the government.

=== Assessment of the sack ===
Despite the popular image of the Vandals as destroyers, the severity of the sack is debatable, with claims that it inflicted little murder, violence, or arson. This interpretation seems to stem from Prosper's claim of the promise of leniency which Pope Leo I coaxed from Gaiseric. The Byzantine historian Procopius reported the burning of a church. Some modern historians like John Henry Haaren maintain that temples, public buildings, private houses and even the emperor's palace were sacked. The Vandals also took immense quantities of gold, silver, jewels and furniture, destroyed works of art, and killed a number of citizens.

== Works cited ==
=== Books ===
- Conant, Jonathan (2012). Staying Roman: Conquest and Identity in Africa and the Mediterranean, 439–700. Cambridge University Press. ISBN 9781139048101.
- Gibbon, Edward (2015). The History of the Decline and Fall of the Roman Empire. Vol. 4. Cambridge University Press. ISBN 9781139333573.
- Moralee, Jason (2017). Rome's Holy Mountain: The Capitoline Hill in Late Antiquity. Vol. 1. Oxford University Press. doi:10.1093/oso/9780190492274.001.0001. ISBN 9780190492298.
- Lee, A. (2013). From Rome to Byzantium AD 363 to 565: The Transformation of Ancient Rome. Edinburgh University Press. ISBN 9780748627905. JSTOR 10.3366/j.ctt1g0b1z1.
- Salzman, Michele (2021). The Falls of Rome. Crises, Resilience, and Resurgence in Late Antiquity. Cambridge University Press. ISBN 9781316275924.

=== Journals ===
- Clover, Frank (1978). "The Family and Early Career of Anicius Olybrius". Historia. 27 (1). Franz Steiner Verlag: 169–96. JSTOR 4435589.
- Gillett, Andrew (2001). "Rome, Ravenna and the Last Western Emperors". Papers of the British School at Rome. 69 (69). British School at Rome: 131–67. doi:10.1017/S0068246200001781. JSTOR 40311008.
