= Licinia Eudoxia =

Wife of Western Roman emperor Valentinian III

- Augusta of the Western Roman Empire
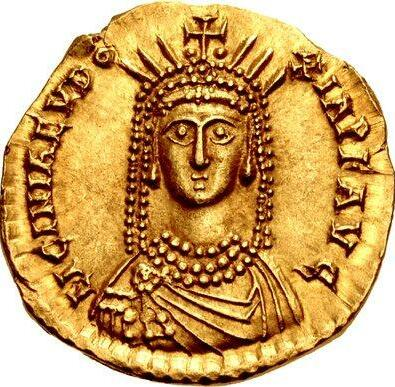
- Solidus of Licinia Eudoxia

Roman empress
- Tenure: 437–455
- Born: 422; Constantinople (modern-day Istanbul, Turkey)
- Died: c. 493 (aged ~71); Constantinople (modern-day Istanbul, Turkey)
- Spouse: Valentinian III; Petronius Maximus
- Issue: Eudocia; Placidia
Names
- Licinia Eudoxia
Regnal name
- Licinia Eudoxia Augusta
- Dynasty: Theodosian and Valentinianic
- Father: Theodosius II
- Mother: Aelia Eudocia

Licinia Eudoxia (Greek: Λικινία, 422 – c. 493) was a Roman Empress, daughter of Eastern Roman Emperor Theodosius II. In early childhood she was placed in a political marriage with the Western Roman Emperor Valentinian III. Following the assassination of Valentinian, the usurper Petronius Maximus compelled Eudoxia to marry him. Captured during the sack of Rome, which she was claimed to have helped instigate, Eudoxia spent seven years as a captive of the Vandal Kingdom before being ransomed by the imperial court at Constantinople.

== Family ==
Eudoxia was born in 422, the daughter of Theodosius II, Eastern Roman Emperor and his consort Aelia Eudocia, a woman of Athenian origin. Her only known siblings, Flacilla and possibly Arcadius, predeceased their parents. Their paternal grandparents were Arcadius and Aelia Eudoxia. Their maternal grandfather was Leontius, a sophist from Athens.

The identity of her maternal grandfather was first given by Socrates of Constantinople. John Malalas later gave a more detailed account of her mother Eudocia's history. The identity of Eudoxia's maternal grandmother is not recorded.

== First marriage ==
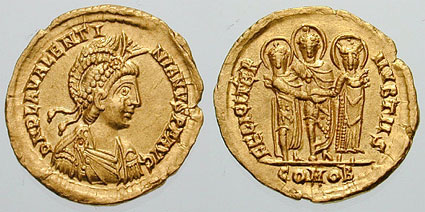
Solidus minted in Thessalonica to celebrate the marriage of Valentinian III to Licinia Eudoxia. The bride's father, Theodosius II, stands between them on the reverse.

In 424, Eudoxia was betrothed to Valentinian III, her first cousin, once removed. The year of their betrothal was recorded by Marcellinus Comes. At the time of their betrothal, Valentinian was approximately four years old, Eudoxia only two. Galla Placidia was Valentinian III's mother and a younger, paternal half-sister of Arcadius. Valentinian III was at the time being prepared to claim the throne of the Western Roman Empire, which was held by Joannes. The latter was not a member of the Theodosian dynasty and thus regarded a usurper by the Eastern court. Within 424, Valentinian was proclaimed a Caesar in the Eastern court. The following year, Joannes was defeated and executed. Valentinian replaced him as Augustus of the West.

Eudoxia and Valentinian III married on 29 October 437, in Thessalonike, their marriage marking the reunion of the two halves of the House of Theodosius. The marriage was recorded by Socrates of Constantinople, the Chronicon Paschale and Marcellinus Comes. In 439, Eudoxia was granted the title of Augusta, with the birth of their first daughter Eudocia. They also had a second daughter, Placidia. The births and eventual fates of the two daughters were recorded by Priscus, Procopius, John Malalas and the Chronicon Paschale.

On 16 March 455, Valentinian III was killed in the Campus Martius. According to the fragmentary chronicle of John of Antioch, a 7th-century monk tentatively identified with John of the Sedre, the assassination had been arranged by the wealthy senator Petronius Maximus.

== Second marriage ==
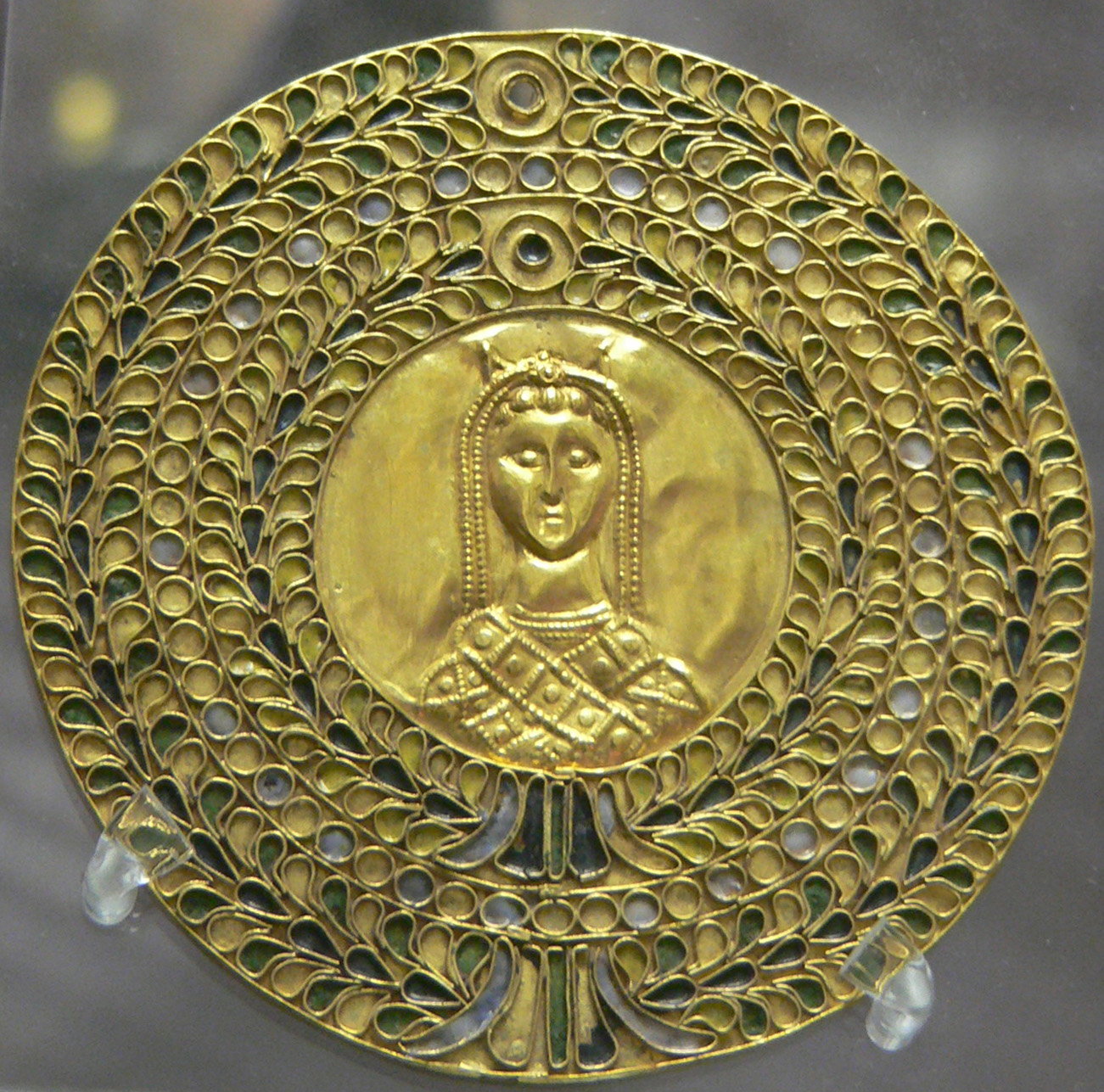
Gold medallion of Eudoxia

Valentinian had no male descendants and had never designated an heir. Several candidates claimed the throne, with Eudoxia supporting Majorian. John of Antioch reports that Petronius Maximus, the highest-ranking of all Roman senators, secured the position of emperor by buying the loyalties of palace officials and the local military. Eudoxia was forced to marry him or face execution. Their marriage secured the connection of Maximus to the Theodosian dynasty. Prosper of Aquitaine reports that Maximus befriended the murderers of Valentinian III instead of punishing them. Both Prosper and Victor of Tonnena place the marriage of Eudoxia to Maximus only days following the death of her first husband, commenting with disapproval that the empress was not given a period to grieve for Valentinian. Maximus further arranged the marriage of his son Palladius to his new stepdaughter Eudocia, the daughter of Eudoxia from her first marriage, making another link to the Theodosian dynasty.

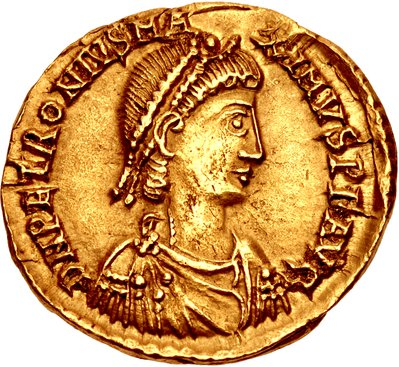
Solidus of Petronius Maximus

The reign of Maximus was to prove short. According to the chronicler Malchus, "Around this time, the empress Eudoxia, the widow of the emperor Valentinian and the daughter of the emperor Theodosius and Eudocia, remained unhappily at Rome and, enraged at the tyrant Maximus because of the murder of her spouse, she summoned the Vandal Gaiseric, king of Africa, against Maximus, who was ruling Rome. He came suddenly to Rome with his forces and captured the city, and having destroyed Maximus and all his forces, he took everything from the palace, even the bronze statues. He even led away as captives surviving senators, accompanied by their wives; along with them he also carried off to Carthage in Africa the empress Eudoxia, who had summoned him; her daughter Placidia, the wife of the patrician Olybrius, who then was staying at Constantinople; and even the maiden Eudocia. After he had returned, Gaiseric gave the younger Eudocia, a maiden, the daughter of the empress Eudoxia, to his son Huneric in marriage, and he held them both, the mother and the daughter, in great honor." (Chron. 366). Eudoxia was presumably following the example of her sister-in-law Justa Grata Honoria, who had summoned Attila the Hun for help against an unwanted marriage.

== Widow ==
The three women stayed prisoners in Carthage for seven years. In 462, Leo I, Eastern Roman Emperor, paid a large ransom for Eudoxia and Placidia. Eudoxia returned to Constantinople after an absence of twenty-five years, Placidia joining her. Eudocia stayed in Africa and took Huneric as her husband. They were parents to Hilderic, king of the Vandals from 523 to 530.

== See also ==
- List of Byzantine emperors
- List of Roman and Byzantine Empresses

== Bibliography ==
- Martindale, John R., ed. (1980). The Prosopography of the Later Roman Empire: Volume II, AD 395–527. Cambridge: Cambridge University Press. ISBN 0-521-20159-4.
- Mathisen, Ralph W (6 August 1996). "Licinia Eudoxia".
- Drinkwater, John; Elton, Hugh, eds. (2002) [1992]. Fifth-Century Gaul: A Crisis of Identity?. Cambridge University Press. ISBN 978-0-521-52933-4.
  - Mommaerts, T S; Kelley, D H (2002). The Anicii of Gaul and Rome. pp. 111–121., in Drinkwater & Elton (2002)
- Genealogical profile
- Valentinian III in the Prosopography of the Later Roman Empire

Royal titles
Preceded by Galla Placidia	Western Roman Empress consort 437–455	Succeeded by Marcia Euphemia
