= Eudocia (daughter of Valentinian III) =

Daughter of Roman emperor

Eudocia /juːˈdoʊʃə/ or Eudoxia /juːˈdɒkʃə/ (439 – 466/474?) was the elder daughter of Roman emperor Valentinian III and his wife, Licinia Eudoxia. She was thus the granddaughter on her mother's side of Eastern emperor Theodosius II and his wife, the poet Aelia Eudocia; and on her father's side of Western emperor Constantius III and his wife Galla Placidia.

== Biography ==
In the mid-440s, at age five, Eudocia was betrothed to the son of the Vandal king Gaiseric, named Huneric, who was a hostage in Italy. This engagement served to improve relations between the Western court and the Vandal Kingdom in Africa. Their marriage did not take place at this time, however, because Eudocia was not yet of age.

Eudocia's father was assassinated in 455, and his successor, Petronius Maximus, compelled Eudocia's mother to marry him and Eudocia herself to marry his son, Palladius. In response, the Vandals (reportedly at the request of Eudocia's mother) invaded Italy and captured Eudocia, her mother, and her younger sister, Placidia. After seven years, Eudocia's mother and sister were sent to Constantinople, while Eudocia remained in Africa and married Huneric c. 460. They had a son, Hilderic, who reigned as king of the Vandals, from 523 to 530.

At some time following the birth of Hilderic, Eudocia withdrew to Jerusalem due to religious differences with her Arian husband. She died there and was buried in the sepulcher of her grandmother, Aelia Eudocia.

== See also ==
- List of Byzantine emperors
- List of Roman and Byzantine Empresses

== Sources ==
- Evagrius Scholasticus, Ecclesiastical History
- Marcellinus Comes, Chronicon
- Hydatius, Chronicon
- Nicephorus Callistus Xanthopoulos, Ecclesiastical History
- Procopius, de Bello Vandalico
- Theophanes the Confessor, Chronographia
