= Gaiseric =

King of the Vandals and Alans (r. 428–477)

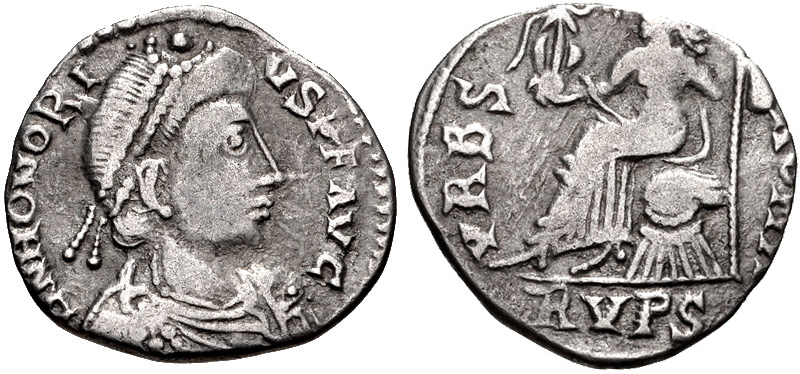
- Siliqua imitating those of Honorius, minted in Gaiseric's reign c. 455–476 AD

King of the Vandals and Alans
- Reign: 428–477 AD
- Predecessor: Gunderic
- Successor: Huneric
- Born: c. 389; Near Lake Balaton, Pannonia Prima, Western Roman Empire
- Died: 25 January 477 (aged 87); Carthage, Vandal Kingdom
- Issue: Huneric; Gento
- Father: Godigisel
- Religion: Arianism

Gaiseric (c. 389 – 25 January 477 AD), also known as Geiseric or Genseric (Latin: Gaisericus, Geisericus; reconstructed Vandalic: *Gaisarīx) (Note: See the following for more detail: Nicoletta Onesti, "Tracing the Language of the Vandals", 16 pages, 22 February 2015. Also see: Nicoletta Onesti, "The Language and Names of the Vandals" 2009, 3, 22 February 2015) was king of the Vandals and Alans from 428 to 477 AD. He ruled over the Vandal kingdom and migrated the kingdom to North Africa, playing a key role in the decline of the Western Roman Empire during the 5th century.

The murder of Roman Emperor Valentinian III, who had betrothed his daughter to Gaiseric's son Huneric, led the Vandal king to invade Italy. The invasion culminated in his most famous exploit, the capture and plundering of Rome in June 455 AD. Gaiseric repulsed two major attempts by both halves of the Roman Empire to reclaim North Africa, inflicting devastating defeats on the forces of Majorian in 460 AD and Basiliscus in 468 AD. As a result, the Romans abandoned their campaign against the Vandals and concluded peace with Gaiseric. Gaiseric died in Carthage in 477 AD and was succeeded by his son, Huneric. During his nearly fifty year rule, Gaiseric transformed a relatively inconsequential Germanic tribe into a major Mediterranean power.

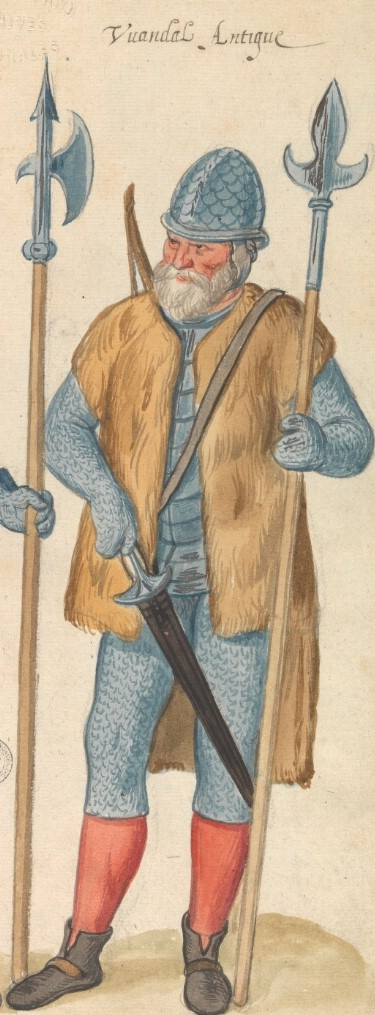
A 16th century perception of the Vandals, illustrated in the manuscript "Théâtre de tous les peuples et nations de la terre avec leurs habits et ornemens divers, tant anciens que modernes, diligemment depeints au naturel". Painted by Lucas d'Heere in the 2nd half of the 16th century. Preserved in the Ghent University Library.

== Path to kingship ==
After his father Godigisel's death in a battle against the Franks during the Crossing of the Rhine, Gaiseric became the second most powerful man among the Vandals, only answering to the newly appointed king, his half-brother Gunderic. His status as a noble of the king's family occurred before his more formal accession to the kingship. Jordanes described Gaiseric in the following manner:

Gaiseric ... was a man of moderate height and lame in consequence of a fall from his horse. He was a man of deep thought and few words, holding luxury in disdain, furious in his anger, greedy for gain, shrewd in winning over the barbarians and skilled in sowing the seeds of dissension to arouse enmity.

Gunderic's death in 428 paved the way for Gaiseric's ascension to king of the Vandals; his rise to power was accompanied by continued hostilities against competing powers begun by his brother. He likewise sought ways of increasing the power and wealth of his people (Vandals and some Alans), who then resided in the Roman province of Hispania Baetica in southern Hispania. The Vandals had suffered greatly from attacks from the more numerous Visigothic federates, and not long after taking power, Gaiseric decided to leave Hispania to his rivals. In fact, he seems to have started building a Vandal fleet for a potential exodus even before he became king. Before he could make his move to Africa, Gaiseric was attacked by a large force of Suebi under the command of Heremigarius, who had managed to take Lusitania. However, this Suebic army was later defeated during the Battle of Mérida (428) and its leader drowned in the Guadiana River while trying to flee.

== Africa ==
After defending the aforementioned Suebian attack at Mérida, Gaiseric led most of his people—possibly as many as 80,000 persons—to Northern Africa in 428/429; some scholars claim that this figure represents an exaggeration and the number was probably closer to 20,000. (Note: This figure is drawn from Hyd., Chron. 300.28 Lem. 77; Prosper 395.1278. Cf. also Chron. Gall 452.107. Historian Peter Heather suggests a figure of 50,000 people—including more than 10,000 warriors—were moved to Africa in 429.) Whatever the true numbers, there are indications that the Vandals under Gaiseric may have been invited by the Roman governor Bonifacius, who wished to use the military strength of the Vandals in his struggle against the imperial government under the Roman general, Aetius.

Crossing at the Straits of Gibraltar, Gaiseric led not only his Vandal brethren and army, but was likely accompanied by a contingent of Alans and Goths. Once there, he won many battles over the weak and divided Roman defenders and quickly overran the territory now comprising modern Morocco and northern Algeria. His Vandal army defeated the Bonifatius's army in the battle of Calama and laid siege to the city of Hippo Regius (during which its bishop, Augustine of Hippo, died of an illness), taking it after 14 months of bitter fighting. Gaiseric and his forces then began subduing the interior of Numidia.

A peace between Gaiseric and the Roman Emperor Valentinian III was concluded in 435; in return for recognition of Gaiseric as king of the lands he had conquered, the Vandals would desist from further attacks on Carthage, pay a tribute to the Empire, and send Gaiseric's son Huneric as a hostage to Rome. Gaiseric's treaty with the Romans also included Vandal retention of Mauretania and part of Numidia as foederati (allies under special treaty) of Rome.

Prosper of Aquitaine wrote that Gaiseric had four of his Hispano-Roman counsellors executed after they refused to convert to Arianism. He later banned all non-Arians from serving in his court in the 450s or 460s.

In a surprise move on 19 October 439, Gaiseric captured Carthage, a devastating blow to imperial power, taking advantage of Aetius's preoccupation with affairs in Gaul. Classical scholar Stewart Oost observed, "Thus he undoubtedly achieved what had been his purpose since he first crossed to Africa." Historian Chris Wickham argues that Gaiseric's conquest of Carthage presaged Rome's later collapse. The Romans were caught unaware, and Gaiseric captured a large part of the western Roman navy docked in the port of Carthage. The Catholic bishop of the city, Quodvultdeus, was exiled to Naples, since Gaiseric demanded that all his close advisors follow the Arian form of Christianity. The subsequent sermons of Quodvultdeus paint a "dark picture of the Vandal plunderers."

In the wake of Gaiseric's assault on Carthage, North African bishop and historian, Victor of Vita, wrote in his Historia persecutionis Africanae provinciae sub Geiserico et Hunerico regibus Vandalorum (History of the Persecution in the Province of Africa under the Vandal Kings Gaiseric and Huneric) that the Vandal king immediately began to unrelentingly persecute adherents of the Nicene Christian faith. According to historian Peter Heather, Victor also claimed "that 'innumerable' Nicene bishops and priests were tortured and put to death by Vandals as they sacked and pillaged Nicene churches for their treasures." Heather doubts Victor of Vita's claim of a deliberate and prompt campaign by Gaiseric to persecute Nicene Christians and instead, avows it was more likely not until after 442, when the combined attempt by Eastern and Western Rome to retake Carthage failed; only then did the Vandal king put "considered religious policies into operation." Heather likewise points out how Gaiseric's religious policies seem not to have been applied to the other Vandal provinces of Numidia and Byzacena, where the Nicene Church operated freely in two-thirds of the Vandal kingdom.

Notwithstanding the blow to the imperial coffers caused by Gaiseric's seizure of African revenue and the corresponding grain supply, the Vandal king had no intention of depriving Italy of Africa's grain; he instead wished to sell it to the emperor for profit. Meanwhile, his new status was that of Proconsularis and as such, Gaiseric made Carthage his new residence. Inheriting an already economically efficient and effective state, the tax revenues from his new lands enabled the Vandal conqueror to construct a large fleet that challenged imperial control over the Mediterranean. Gaiseric presided over a mixture of Vandals, Alans, Goths and Romans in Africa, relying on an ad-hoc administration under auspices of the imperial government to legitimize his rule. Latin literary culture even flourished in Carthage.

Gaiseric besieged Panormus (Palermo, Sicily) in 440 AD but was repulsed. Hunnic invasions into the lower Danube forced Constantinople to withdraw forces from Sicily to the benefit of Gaiseric. In a 442 treaty with Rome, the Vandals were recognized as the independent rulers of Byzacena and part of Numidia. In 455, Gaiseric seized the Balearic Islands, Sardinia, Corsica, and Malta, and his fleet soon came to control much of the western Mediterranean. During 455, the Roman emperor Valentinian III was murdered on orders of Petronius Maximus, who usurped the throne. Petronius Maximus also married Valentinian's widow, Licinia Eudoxia, and likewise wedded the imperial couple's daughter Eudocia to his own son; the latter had formerly been promised to Gaiseric's son, Huneric, which contributed a possible casus belli that was exploited by the Vandal king. Gaiseric was of the opinion that these acts voided his 442 peace treaty with Valentinian, and on 31 May, he and his men landed on Italian soil.

== Sack of Rome in 455 ==
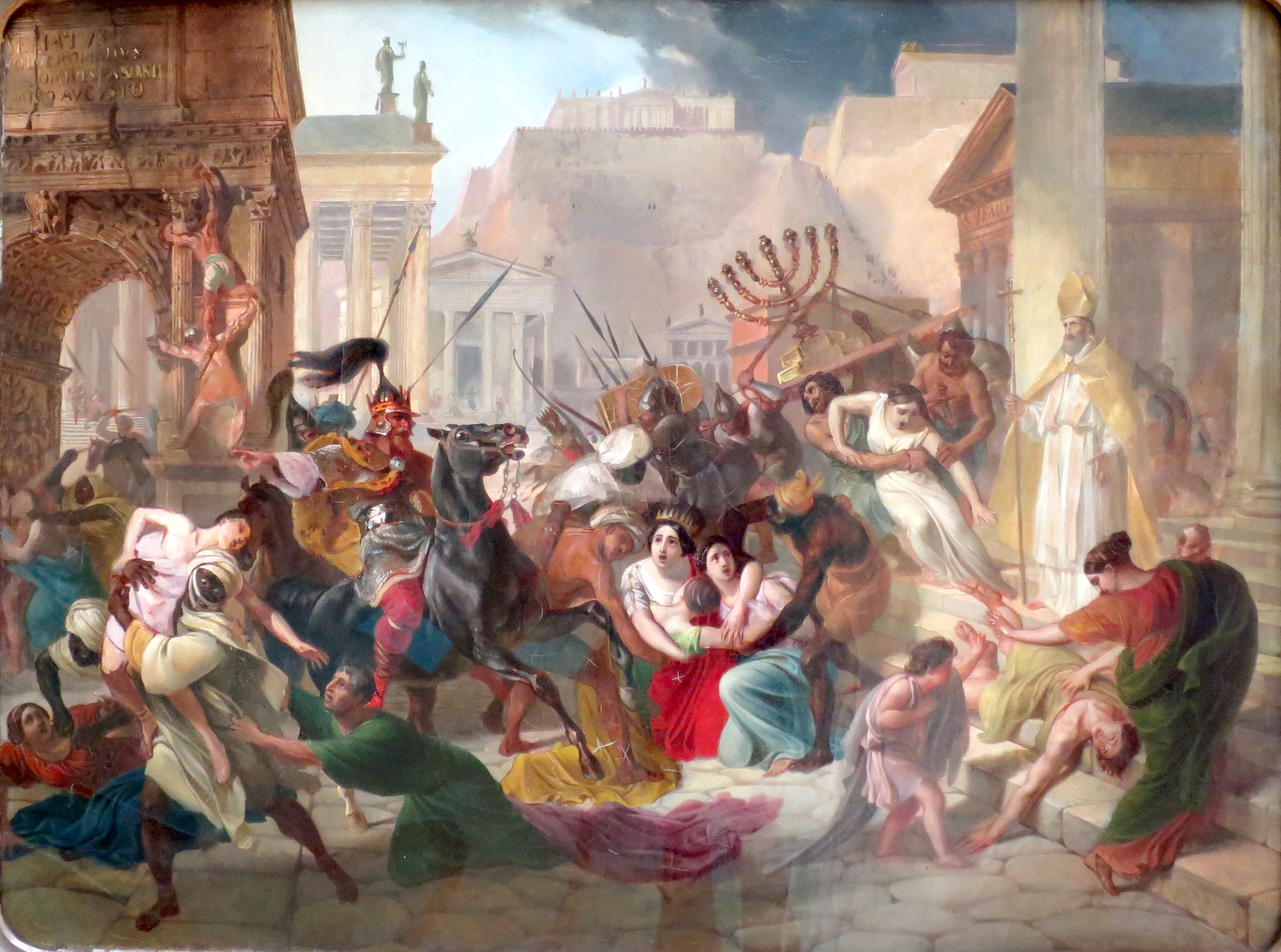
Gaiseric Sacking Rome, a painting by Karl Briullov (1833–1836)

Responding to the actions of Petronius Maximus, Gaiseric moved a large seaborne force from Carthage to Italy and sacked the city in a more thorough manner than even Alaric's Goths had carried out in 410. Historian Michael Kulikowski notes that unlike Alaric, who besieged Rome as an itinerant barbarian general in "desperate straits," Gaiseric was the king of a flourishing polity and was therefore able to systematically conduct the sack. More than just systematically attack Rome, Gaiseric's invasion was a devastating blow to the empire itself, so much so that the late historian Michael Grant once claimed, "Gaiseric contributed more to the collapse of the Western Roman Empire than any other single man."

Before Gaiseric marched upon Rome, Pope Leo I implored him not to destroy the ancient city or murder its inhabitants. Gaiseric agreed and the gates of Rome were thrown open to him and his men. (Note: Nonetheless, Gaiseric's military success had long been and certainly remained dependent upon the continued support of not only his Vandal kin, but that of his allied Suebi, Alans, and Goths.) Once inside the city, the invaders plundered it thoroughly, to the extent that Procopius noted how the Vandals had even stripped the gold from the ceiling of the Jupiter Capitolinus temple—but more significant was the capture of important figures and dignitaries in the city, whose return remained a bargaining point between the Vandals and the Empire for many years to come. Routine Vandal raids along the coast of Italy and the Mediterranean characterized the situation during the first years after Gaiseric's successful seizure of Rome.

Petronius Maximus, who was foremost among those vying for power in the wake of Valentinian III's murder, fled rather than fight the Vandal warlord. (Note: Maximus was killed by a Roman mob outside the city, fatally struck it seems by a roof tile hurled at him and then his body torn limb for limb.) Although history remembers the Vandal sack of Rome as extremely brutal—making the word vandalism a term for any wantonly destructive act—in actuality, the Vandals did not wreak great destruction in the city; they did, however, take gold, silver and many other things of value. Gaiseric also took with him Empress Eudoxia and her daughters, Eudocia, and Placidia, as well as riches from the city. Across Italy, the shock of the Vandal sack of Rome and the ongoing presence of the Vandals paralyzed the imperial government. (Note: Some of the treasures taken back to Carthage by Gaiseric included valuables acquired from the Roman sack of Jerusalem from 70 AD. Additionally, Gaiseric led an incursion near Agrigento in 456 but was repulsed there and defeated by Ricimer in a naval battle off the coast of Corsica.) Eudocia married Gaiseric's son Huneric after arriving in Carthage. That union produced Hilderic—Gaiseric's grandson—who later played a critical role in Emperor Justinian's sixth-century conquests of north Africa. (Note: Two consecutive decades' worth of conflict between the Vandals and the two Empires followed the sack of Rome, until they eventually reached peace in 476. The subsequent deaths of both the last Roman Emperor of the West (Romulus) and Gaiseric—atop the succession of inept barbarian leadership—diminished the threats to the ever more powerful Byzantine Empire.)

== Later exploits and final years ==
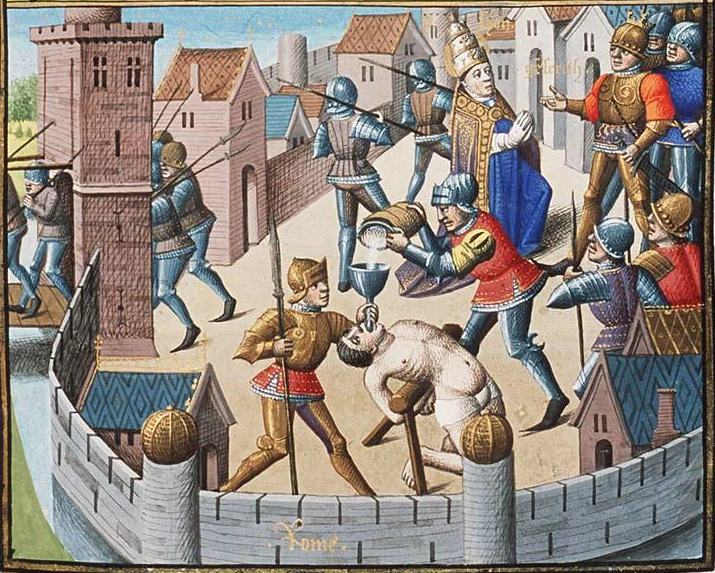
Pope Leo the Great attempts to persuade Gaiseric, prince of Vandals, to abstain from sacking Rome (miniature c. 1475).

Sometime in 460, the Emperor Majorian began collecting an invasion fleet for an assault against the Vandals. Once Gaiseric received word of this initiative, he preempted the attack by sending vessels from Carthage to Carthago Nova, where the Vandal ships burned the imperial boats at their moorings, again proving himself "more than a match for the imperial establishments of both West and East." Then in early 462, Gaiseric sent the empress Eudoxia with her daughters Eudocia and Placidia—captured during the sack of Rome—back to Constantinople from Carthage in an act of reconciliation with the Empire, likely intending to preserve the marriage of his son Huneric to Eudocia.

While rhetorical writing from the period still distinguished between "barbarian" and Romans and the imperial state attempted to exercise control over the empire and its peripheries, the elite population in the lands controlled by the likes of the Germanic chieftains Theodoric and Gaiseric, preferred the certainties of their leadership over "the vagaries and ineptitude of the would-be imperial government in Italy." (Note: The rogue military commander Marcellinus—who ruled in Dalmatia—even dealt a naval defeat to Gaiseric's fleet at Sicily in 464–465, albeit acting on his own accord.)

In 468, Gaiseric's kingdom was the target of the last concerted effort by the two halves of the Roman Empire. (Note: He occupied Sicily in 468 for 8 years until the island was ceded in 476 to Odoacer except for a toehold on the far west coast, Lilybaeum, which was ceded in 491 to Theodoric.) They wished to subdue the Vandals and end their pirate raids, so Emperor Leo sent an armada from Constantinople led by Basiliscus. (Note: According to Procopius, the total invasion force consisted of 100,000 men with a fleet drawn from the whole of the eastern Mediterranean. For more on this, see: Procopius, De Bello III.6.1. Translated by H. B. Dewing, Procopius (Cambridge: Loeb Classical Library, 1979), vol. 2 p. 55.) Gaiseric sent a fleet of 500 Vandal ships against the Romans, losing 340 ships in the first engagement, but succeeded in destroying 600 Roman ships in the second battle, during which fireships were employed by Gaiseric to devastating effect. This catastrophic defeat of the Roman fleet by Gaiseric's forces was claimed to have cost the imperial coffers upwards of 64,000 pounds of gold and 700,000 pounds of silver. The Romans abandoned the campaign and Gaiseric remained master of the western Mediterranean until his death, ruling from the Strait of Gibraltar all the way to Tripolitania. (Note: See the translation of Priscus, fragment 42 and Candidus Isaurus in Gordon.) (Note: Numismatic evidence indicates that Gaiseric had coins minted in his likeness. See: https://artgallery.yale.edu/collections/objects/126957)

Following up the Byzantine defeat, the Vandals tried to invade the Peloponnese but were driven back by the Maniots at Kenipolis with heavy losses. In retaliation, the Vandals took 500 hostages at Zakynthos, hacked them to pieces, and threw the body parts overboard on the way to Carthage.

In 474, Gaiseric made peace with the Eastern Roman Empire through a treaty negotiated by the Constantinopolitan Senator, Severus, who was acting under Zeno's authority. He gave Sicily to Odoacer in 476, in exchange for an annual tribute. After enjoying just a few short years of peace, Gaiseric died at Carthage in 477, succeeded by his son Huneric, who did not have his father's enviable reputation and Vandal authority began to diminish. Nonetheless, the peace established by Zeno between Vandal-controlled Carthage and Constantinople lasted until 530, when Justinian's conquests broke it.

== See also ==
- Alaric I
- Augustine: The Decline of the Roman Empire
- Barbarians Rising
- Battle of Agrigentum (456)
- Odoacer

== Bibliography ==
- Bunson, Matthew (1995). A Dictionary of the Roman Empire. Oxford and New York: Oxford University Press. ISBN 978-0-19510-233-8.
- Bury, J.B. (1923). History of the Later Roman Empire: From the Death of Theodosius I to the Death of Justinian. Vol. I. New York: Macmillan. OCLC 963903029.
- Conant, Jonathan (2012). Staying Roman: Conquest and Identity in Africa and the Mediterranean, 439–700. Cambridge University Press. ISBN 9781139048101.
- Early, Joseph (2015). A History of Christianity. Nashville, TN: B & H Academic. ISBN 978-1-43368-363-3.
- Gordon, Colin D. (1966). The Age of Attila: Fifth Century Byzantium and the Barbarians. Ann Arbor, MI: University of Michigan Press. OCLC 314897401.
- Grant, Michael (1978). History of Rome. New York: Scribner. ISBN 0-684-15986-4.
- Greenhalgh, Peter; Eliopoulos, Edward (1986). Deep into Mani: Journey to the Southern Tip of Greece. London: Faber and Faber. ISBN 0-57113-524-2.
- Heather, Peter (2005). The Fall of the Roman Empire: A New History of Rome and the Barbarians. Oxford and New York: Oxford University Press. ISBN 978-0-19515-954-7.
- Heather, Peter (2012). Empires and Barbarians: The Fall of Rome and the Birth of Europe. Oxford and New York: Oxford University Press. ISBN 978-0-19-989226-6.
- Heather, Peter (2022). Christendom: The Triumph of a Religion, AD 300–1300. New York: Knopf. ISBN 978-0-45149-430-6.
- Jordanes (1915). The Gothic History of Jordanes. Translated by Charles C. Mierow. London: Oxford University Press. OCLC 463056290.
- Kulikowski, Michael (2019). The Tragedy of Empire: From Constantine to the Destruction of Roman Italy. Cambridge, MA: The Belknap Press of Harvard University Press. ISBN 978-0-67466-013-7.
- Lançon, Bertrand (2001). Rome in Late Antiquity: AD 312–609. New York: Routledge. ISBN 978-0-41592-975-2.
- Lee, A.D. (2013). From Rome to Byzantium, AD 363 to 565: The Transformation of Ancient Rome. Edinburgh: Edinburgh University Press. ISBN 978-0-74862-790-5.
- Lucas de Heere. "Théâtre de tous les peuples et nations de la terre avec leurs habits et ornemens divers, tant anciens que modernes, diligemment depeints au naturel par Luc Dheere peintre et sculpteur Gantois[manuscript]". lib.ugent.be.
- Merrills, Andy; Miles, Richard (2010). The Vandals. Malden, MA: Wiley-Blackwell. ISBN 978-1-44431-807-4.
- Oost, Stewart (1968). Galla Placidia Augusta: A Biographical Essay. Chicago and London: University of Chicago Press. OCLC 561770132.
- Pohl, Walter (2004). "The Vandals: Fragments of a Narrative". In A.H. Merrills (ed.). Vandals, Romans and Berbers: New Perspectives on Late Antique North Africa. Burlington, VT: Ashgate Publishing. ISBN 978-0-75464-145-2.
- Schwarcz, Andreas (2004). "The Settlement of Vandals in North Africa". In A.H. Merrills (ed.). Vandals, Romans and Berbers: New Perspectives on Late Antique North Africa. Burlington, VT: Ashgate Publishing. ISBN 978-0-75464-145-2.
- Wickham, Chris (2005). Framing the Early Middle Ages: Europe and the Mediterranean, 400–800. Oxford; New York: Oxford University Press. OCLC 1025811203.
- Wijnendaele, Jeroen W. P. (2014). The Last of the Romans: Bonifatius – Warlord and Comes Africae. London and New York: Bloomsbury. ISBN 978-1-78093-847-9.
