= Heraclius (primicerius sacri cubiculi) =

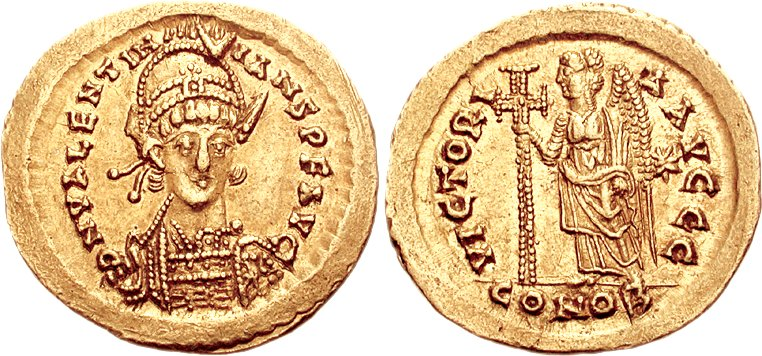
Valentinianus III. 425-455 AD

Heraclius (died March 16, 455) was an influential eunuch of the Western Roman Emperor Valentinian III.

== Biography ==
Heraclius was a eunuch and the primicerius sacri cubiculi of the Western Roman Emperor Valentinian III, on whom he had a great influence.

Heraclius was an enemy of the powerful general Aetius, and allied himself with the senator Petronius Maximus, who also opposed Aetius. The two of them convinced Valentinian that Aetius wanted to kill him, and the Emperor killed Aetius in 454. However, his alliance with Petronius ended with the death of Aetius: when Petronius asked to be conferred the consulship and the patriciate, Heraclius advised Valentinian to refuse.

One year later, in 455, Optila and Thraustila, two barbarian officers in Valentinian's service but loyal to Aetius, killed the Emperor by order of Petronius while Valentinian was on the Campus Martius to train with the bow; on the same occasion, Thraustila killed Heraclius.

== Bibliography ==
=== Primary sources ===
- Evagrius Scholasticus, ii.7
- Hydatius, 160
- Jordanes, Romana, 334
- John of Antioch, fragments 200-201
- Marcellinus Comes, s.a. 455
- Prosper of Aquitaine, s.a. 454-455
- Theophanes the Confessor, AM 5946
- Victor of Tunnuna, s.a. 455

=== Secondary sources ===
- Martindale, John R.; Jones, A. H. M.; Morris, John, eds. (1971). "Heraclius 3". The Prosopography of the Later Roman Empire: Volume I, AD 260–395. Cambridge: Cambridge University Press. p. 541. ISBN 0-521-07233-6.
