= Thraustila =

Bodyguard of Roman general Aetius

Thraustila (fl. 455 AD) was a Hun or a Goth bodyguard of Roman general Aetius, who participated in the assassination of Emperor Valentinian III, ordered by Petronius Maximus. He probably served Aetius as a bucellarius.

== History ==
In September 454, Valentinian had killed with his own hands Aetius, whom he held responsible for the troubles of the Roman Empire. In March of the next year, Valentinian was stabbed to death by Thraustila's fellow bodyguard Optila, while Thraustila killed the eunuch Heraclius. Most of the soldiers standing by, who had been followers of Aetius, did not move a finger to help the emperor.

Thraustila was probably married to a daughter of Aetius. He was a Hun, though he is described both as a "Hun" and a "Scythian", a term applied to the Huns at the time.
