= Optila =

Bodyguard of Roman general Aetius

Optila (fl. 455 AD) was either a Hun or a Goth bodyguard working for general Aetius and later for Roman Emperor Valentinian III. He is best known for being the assassin of Valentinian III, himself the assassin of Aetius.

== History ==
He initially served as bucellarius and was later promoted to the imperial guard. In September 454, Emperor Valentinian killed with his own hands Aetius in Ravenna, while the latter was delivering a financial account. With the death of Aetius, Petronius Maximus looked forward to being made patrician in place of Aetius. However, he was blocked by the eunuch Heraclius. Thus Maximus arranged with Optila and Thraustila, both Aetius' former bodyguards, for the assassination of both Heraclius and emperor Valentinian. Optila stabbed the emperor to death on 16 March 455, as he was dismounting in Campus Martius in preparation for a session of archery practice. Meanwhile, Thraustila killed Heraclius.
