= 440s =

Decade

The 440s decade ran from January 1, 440, to December 31, 449.

== Events ==
=== 440 ===
==== By place ====
====== Europe ======
- Flavius Aetius, Roman general (magister militum), returns as triumphator back to Rome, after several years' fighting the Burgundians and Visigoths in Gaul. He is honoured by a statue erected by the Senate, and by order of Emperor Valentinian III.
- The Huns under Attila reappear in force, along the frontier of the Western Roman Empire. They attack merchants on the north bank of the Danube and cities in Illyricum, including (according to Priscus) Viminacium, city of Moesia.

====== Africa ======
- A Vandal fleet and their allies (Alans, Goths and Moors) set out from Carthage for Sicily, the principal supplier of oil and grain to Italy after the loss of North Africa. They loot all the coastal towns and besiege Palermo. Heavily laden ships return to the court of King Genseric.

====== Asia ======
- Northern and Southern dynasties: Northern China is unified by the Northern Wei dynasty. The South is still under the control of the Song (or Liu Song) dynasty.
- A center of Buddhist studies is established at Nalanda in Bihar on the plains of the Ganges River (India).

====== Persia ======
- The Hephthalites (White Huns) move south from the Altai Mountains region into Transoxiana, Bactria, Khorasan and eastern Persia.

==== By topic ====
====== Art ======
- The Parting of Lot and Abraham, mosaic in the nave arcade, Church of Santa Maria Maggiore (Rome), is made.

====== Ancient Games ======
- Chaturanga, Indian war game and an ancestor of chess through the Persian game of Shatranj (or Chatrang), evolves in the Indus Valley on the Indian subcontinent (approximate date).

====== Religion ======
- August 18 – Pope Sixtus III dies after an 8-year reign in which he has resisted heresy and sponsored major construction programs in Rome. He is succeeded by Leo I as the 45th pope.
- September 29 – Leo I begins to formulate Orthodoxy and condemns Eutychianism, an extreme form of monophysitism which holds that the human nature of Christ is absorbed by His divine nature.
- Winter – Leo I sends a letter to Valentinian III stating, "by the Holy Spirit's inspiration the emperor needs no human instruction and is incapable of doctrinal error".

=== 441 ===
==== By place ====
====== Byzantium ======
- Chrysaphius, chief minister, persuades Emperor Theodosius II at Constantinople to dismiss his sister Pulcheria, for her policy of exiling the Jews, and destroying their synagogues.
- Theodosius II sends the Eastern imperial fleet, under the command of the Romano-Goth Areobindus, into Sicilian waters, taking the Vandals by surprise.
- Pulcheria leaves for the seaport Hebdomon (Turkey), and becomes a nun to support Nestorianism in the Holy Land (Palestine).
- The Huns, led by Attila, attack Constanţa (modern Romania), one of the few remaining Roman forts on the northern bank of the Danube, and designated as a secure trading post. On a crowded market day, the Huns take the town by surprise and slaughter the garrison.

====== Europe ======
- German Saxons establish themselves at the mouth of the Thames River. After a period of peace, Vortimer (son of king Vortigern), defeats the Saxons in four battles in Kent (according to the Anglo-Saxon Chronicle).
- King Hermeric dies after a two-year illness; he is succeeded by his son Rechila, who becomes sole ruler over the Suebic Kingdom of Galicia.
- Rechila invades Baetica and conquers the capital Seville. The Romans are driven from the Iberian Peninsula with the exception of the Levante.
- November 8 – The first Council of Orange is convened under the guidance of Hilary of Arles in Orange (France).

====== Persia ======
- King Yazdegerd II of Persia signs a peace treaty after a short war with the Eastern Roman Empire. Theodosius II sends his commander, Anatolius, to conclude his terms and promise not to build any new fortifications along the border territories.

==== By topic ====
====== Religion ======
- Domnus II succeeds his uncle John as Patriarch of Antioch.

=== 442 ===
==== By place ====
====== Europe ======
- Valentinian III forms a marriage proposal for his eldest daughter Eudocia and Genseric's son Huneric. He is already married to a Visigoth princess, and Genseric decides to free him of his obligations by accusing her of trying to poison him. He leaves her mutilated - her ears and nose are cut off - and sends her back to her father Theodoric I, in Toulouse (Gaul).
- The Huns, on a military campaign along the Danube and the Great Morava, destroy the city of Naissus (modern Serbia). They have mastered siege technology and are able to capture fortified cities. The Roman Senate agrees to pay Attila a tribute of 700 pounds of gold per year.

====== Africa ======
- End of the Vandal War (439-442): Emperor Valentinian III signs a peace treaty with King Genseric, and recognises the Vandal Kingdom. He grants him sovereignty over most of Africa. Genseric gives back Sicily and Mauretania (Algeria and Morocco). This marks the end of the Vandal migrations; they settle in North Africa, with Carthage as their capital.

==== By topic ====
====== Religion ======
- The Monastery of St. Shenouda the Archimandrite (White Monastery) near Sohag (Egypt) is built.

=== 443 ===
==== By place ====
====== Europe ======
- The Burgundians sign a peace treaty with Rome, agreeing to serve as foederati in the Roman army. They begin to move from the Upper Rhine and Flavius Aetius, commander-in-chief (magister militum), gives them land in the Geneva area (Maxima Sequanorum).
- Period of civil war and famine in Britain, caused by rival kingdoms and Pictish invasions; the situation aggravates tensions between Pelagian and Roman factions. Pro-Roman citizens migrate towards Gaul.

==== By topic ====
====== Religion ======
- Gunabhadra, Indian Buddhist monk, is an invited honored guest by emperor Wen of Liu Song (Liu Song dynasty). He translates the Lankavatara Sutra from Sanskrit into the Chinese language.

=== 444 ===
==== By place ====
====== Europe ======
- Flavius Aetius, Roman general (magister militum), settles the Alans around Valence and Orléans, to contain unrest in Brittany.
- Eudocia, eldest daughter of Emperor Valentinian III, is betrothed to Huneric, son of Vandal King Genseric (hostage in Italy).
- Attila the Hun establishes his residence along the Tisza River (modern Hungary), and plans the coming campaign in the Balkans.
- The Irish city of Armagh is founded by Saint Patrick the Great.

==== By topic ====
====== Religion ======
- Pope Leo I extinguishes the Gallican vicariate.
- Dioscorus I becomes Patriarch of Alexandria.

=== 445 ===
==== By place ====
====== Europe ======
- Emperor Valentinian III issues an imperial edict against Manichaeism. Heavy penalties are decreed against those who do not denounce the religion, and retain Manichaean books.
- Petronius Maximus, prominent aristocrat, is given the title of Patrician. He becomes the most honored of all non-imperial Romans, and political rival of Flavius Aetius.
- Bleda, co-ruler of the Huns, dies in a hunting accident. He is possibly murdered at the instigation of his younger brother Attila, with whom he has ruled since 434. Now about 39, Attila takes the throne for himself, and becomes king of the Hunnic Empire.

==== By topic ====
====== Religion ======
- Domnus II, Patriarch of Antioch, summons a synod of Syrian bishops to confirm the deposition of Athanasius of Perrha.
- Ireland: The Diocese of Armagh is created.

=== 446 ===
==== By place ====
====== Europe ======
- Bishop Germanus of Auxerre visits Ravenna, seeking to soften imperial hostility towards the Bagaudae. On his arrival at the capital, empress-mother Galla Placidia sends him a silver dish with a choice selection of prepared dainties—all vegetarian, out of respect for the bishop's strict diet. Germanus petitions the Senate for leniency for the citizens of Armorica (Brittany).
- The Britons and Anglo-Saxon mercenaries, under King Vortigern, appeal to Flavius Aetius (magister militum of Gaul) for military assistance in their struggle against the Picts and Irish. Aetius has enough problems with Attila the Hun and is unable to send any help (according to Groans of the Britons).
- The Cor Tewdws (College of Theodosius), Llantwit Major (Wales), is supposedly burned down by Irish pirates.

====== China ======
- Three Disasters of Wu: The Northern Wei dynasty begins persecuting Buddhists, having heretofore encouraged them. The drain of manpower and tax money to temples and monasteries has threatened the secular government, and the reaction is fierce: monks and nuns are murdered, temples and icons destroyed. All men under age 50 are prohibited from joining any monastic order in a program that will continue until 450, helping the Confucianist philosophy of the Han dynasty to gain dominance over Buddhism.

==== By topic ====
====== Religion ======
- A local synod is held by Turibius of Astorga.
- Flavian becomes patriarch of Constantinople.

=== 447 ===
==== By place ====
====== Byzantium ======
- November 6 – The Walls of Constantinople are severely damaged by an earthquake, which destroys large parts of the structure, including 57 towers. The population is threatened by a plague. Emperor Theodosius II orders Constantine, praetorian prefect of the East, to supervise the repairs. He employs the city's demoi ("Circus factions") in the work, and rebuilds the walls within 60 days.
- The Huns, led by Attila, cross the Danube, and invade the Balkans as far as Thermopylae (Greece). During the invasion, Serdica (modern Sofia) is destroyed. For disobeying the terms of the treaty made in 442, Attila triples his demand for tribute to 2,100 pounds (ca. 700 kg) of gold per year; and the ransom for each Roman prisoner to 12 solidi.
- Theodosius II sends an embassy to Attila; Priscus of Panium, envoy for the Eastern Roman Empire. Priscus records one of the few eyewitness accounts of the Hun kingdom.
- Battle of the Utus: Attila defeats the Roman army near the river Utus (Vit, Bulgaria). The Huns are forced to abandon the siege of Constantinople. They march north and plunder the defenseless Balkan provinces (including Thrace, Scythia, Moesia, Dacia and Illyricum).
- Winter – Theodosius II chooses a policy to protect Constantinople against the Huns. He removes Aspar and Areobindus (magister militum) from their military commands.

====== Europe ======
- Vortigern, king of the Britons, receives the Saxon leaders Hengist and Horsa "as friends" and grants the brothers the Isle of Thanet, most easterly point of Kent (England).

==== By topic ====
====== Arts and Sciences ======
- The first entry in the Annales Cambriæ refers to this year.

====== Religion ======
- Germanus, bishop of Auxerre, makes his second visit to Britain. He spiritually combats the revived Pelagian threat and expels the Irish from Powys (Wales).
- The Synod of Toledo (Spain) tries to add the filioque clause to the Nicene Creed. The Eastern Orthodox Church refuses to go along with this idea.

=== 448 ===
==== By place ====
====== Byzantium ======
- Emperor Theodosius II sends an embassy to Attila the Hun; Anatolius, an Eastern Roman general (magister militum) responsible for the security of the Eastern frontier, achieves a peace treaty with the Huns, in exchange for an annual tribute of 950 kilograms (2,100 lb) of gold per year.
- Attila demands in the treaty the evacuation of the territory running from Singidunum (Belgrade, in Serbia) 500 kilometres (300 mi) east along the Danube to Novae (Svishtov, in Bulgaria). This depopulated buffer zone deprives the Romans of their natural defensive advantages.
- Theodosius II orders all non-Christian books burned.

====== Europe ======
- Flavius Aetius suppresses the Bagaudae in Armorica (Gaul), and defeats the Salian Franks under King Chlodio near Arras (Belgica Secunda); the invaders are stopped around a river-crossing near Vicus Helena.
- Rechiar succeeds his father Rechila as king of the Suebi in Galicia (Northern Spain). He marries a daughter of the Visigoth king Theodoric I and converts to Catholicism.

====== China ======
- Kou Qianzhi, Chinese Daoist reformer, dies after having converted emperor Taiwu of Northern Wei and having established Daoism as the country's dominant religion. His death presages a revival of Buddhism as China's dominant faith.

==== By topic ====
====== Religion ======
- Eutyches is accused of heresy at a synod held in Constantinople.

=== 449 ===
==== By place ====
====== Europe ======
- Emperor Valentinian III sends an embassy to Attila the Hun. The purpose of the meeting is a long-running dispute over spoils of war during the Danube offensive (441–442). Attila claims his lost property, but Valentinian and Flavius Aetius (magister militum) refuse this request.
- Flavius Orestes, Roman aristocrat, is sent to Attila's court and becomes a high-ranking secretary (notarius). He is the father of the future emperor Romulus Augustulus.
- Traditional date – Vortigern, supposed king of the Britons, invites Hengist and Horsa, by tradition chieftains of the Jutes, to form a military alliance against the Picts and Scoti, so contributing to the Anglo-Saxon settlement of Britain (according to Bede).

==== By topic ====
====== Religion ======
- August 3 – The Second Council of Ephesus opens, chaired by Dioscorus, patriarch of Alexandria. Flavian, patriarch of Constantinople, and Domnus II, patriarch of Antioch, are deposed on August 8.
- October – A Roman synod repudiates all the decisions of the Second Council of Ephesus.
- Anatolius becomes patriarch of Constantinople.
- Maximus II becomes patriarch of Antioch.

== Significant people ==
- Attila the Hun, King of the Huns

== Births ==
440

- Bodhidharma, semi-legendary Buddhist monk (approximate date)
- Euric, Visigothic king and son of Theodoric I (d. 484)
- Gaudentius, son of Flavius Aetius (approximate date)
- Qi Wudi, Chinese emperor of the Southern Qi dynasty (d. 493)
- Tonantius Ferreolus, Gallo-Roman senator and prefect of Gaul
- Vakhtang I, king of Iberia (modern Georgia) (approximate date)
- Wen Cheng Di, emperor of the Northern Wei dynasty (d. 465)

441

- Shen Yue, Chinese historian and statesman (d. 513)

442

- Feng, Chinese empress and regent of the Northern Wei dynasty (d. 490)
- Isidore of Miletus, Byzantine architect and mathematician (d. 537)
- Placidia, Roman empress and daughter of Valentinian III (approximate date)

444

- Xiao Ni, prince of Southern Qi (d. 492)

448

- Cyriacus of Athens, Greek anchorite and saint (d. 557)

449

- February 25 – Liu Ziye, emperor of the Liu Song dynasty (d. 466)
- Eugendus, abbot of Condat Abbey (approximate date)
- Kavadh I, king of the Persian Empire (d. 531)

== Deaths ==
440

- February 17 – Mesrob, Armenian monk and linguist (b. 362)
- August 18 – Pope Sixtus III (b. 390)
- Amalgaid mac Fiachrae, king of Connacht (Ireland)
- Yuan Qigui, empress and wife of Wen of Liu Song (b. 405)

441

- Hermeric, king of the Suebi
- John, Patriarch of Antioch

442

- Veh Mihr Shapur, Sasanian military officer and Marzban of Armenia

443

- Zong Bing, Chinese artist and musician

444

- Bricius, bishop of Tours
- Cyril of Alexandria, patriarch and theologian
- Juqu Wuhui, prince of Northern Liang

445

- Arsenius the Great, Desert Father
- King Bleda of the Huns (approximate date)
- Fan Ye, Chinese historian (b. 398)
- Nath Í mac Fiachrach, High King of Ireland

446

- February 19 – Leontius of Trier, Bishop of Trier
- Mac Cairthinn mac Coelboth, king of Leinster (Ireland)
- Proclus, patriarch of Constantinople (approximate date)

447

- Areobindus, Roman general (magister militum)
- Juqu Mujian, prince of the Chinese state Northern Liang
- Secundinus (or Seachnaill), patron saint

448

- Kou Qianzhi, Chinese high official and Daoist (b. 365)
- Rechila, king of the Suebi (approximate date)
- Saint Germanus, bishop of Auxerre (approximate date)

449

- August 11 – Flavian, patriarch of Constantinople
- Eucherius, bishop of Lyon (approximate date)
- Hilary, bishop of Arles (b. 403)
