= Siege of Asemus =

Hun–Eastern Roman conflict

The siege of Asemus was an unsuccessful attempt by the Huns of Attila to capture the fortified hill town of Asemus from the Eastern Roman Empire in 447. After the siege, the Asemuntians attacked the withdrawing Huns and even captured some Hunnic prisoners. This was one of the few Eastern Roman victories over the Huns in the 440s.

== Background ==
In 447 Attila's Huns crossed the Danube and defeated the Eastern Roman army at the Battle of the Utus. From here they marched south to ravage Thrace and threaten Constantinople.

== Siege ==
As the Huns returned north after plundering Thrace, some of them besieged the fortified town of Asemus, which was situated on a hill near the Danube. They were repelled by the Roman garrison and eventually decided to withdraw. The defenders then pursued the fleeing Huns, capturing a number of them and seizing their booty as well as rescuing many Roman prisoners.

== Aftermath ==
Following this conflict, Attila demanded the return of the captured Huns and that a ransom be paid for the freed Romans. The people of Asemus refused, claiming that the prisoners had already gone.
