= 447 =

447 in various calendars
- Gregorian calendar: 447; CDXLVII
- Ab urbe condita: 1200
- Assyrian calendar: 5197
- Balinese saka calendar: 368–369
- Bengali calendar: −147 – −146
- Berber calendar: 1397
- Buddhist calendar: 991
- Burmese calendar: −191
- Byzantine calendar: 5955–5956
- Chinese calendar: 丙戌年 (Fire Dog); 3144 or 2937 — to — 丁亥年 (Fire Pig); 3145 or 2938
- Coptic calendar: 163–164
- Discordian calendar: 1613
- Ethiopian calendar: 439–440
- Hebrew calendar: 4207–4208
- Hindu calendars
- Vikram Samvat: 503–504
- Shaka Samvat: 368–369
- Kali Yuga: 3547–3548
- Holocene calendar: 10447
- Iranian calendar: 175 BP – 174 BP
- Islamic calendar: 180 BH – 179 BH
- Javanese calendar: 331–333
- Julian calendar: 447; CDXLVII
- Korean calendar: 2780
- Minguo calendar: 1465 before ROC 民前1465年
- Nanakshahi calendar: −1021
- Seleucid era: 758/759 AG
- Thai solar calendar: 989–990
- Tibetan calendar: མེ་ཕོ་ཁྱི་ལོ་ (male Fire-Dog); 573 or 192 or −580 — to — མེ་མོ་ཕག་ལོ་ (female Fire-Boar); 574 or 193 or −579

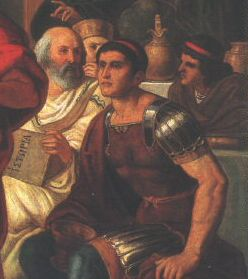
Priscus of Panium (left) with the Roman embassy at the court of Attila the Hun

Year 447 (CDXLVII) was a common year starting on Wednesday of the Julian calendar. At the time, it was known in the Roman Empire as the Year of the Consulship of Calepius and Ardabur (or, less frequently, year 1200 Ab urbe condita). The denomination 447 for this year has been used since the early medieval period, when the Anno Domini calendar era became the prevalent method in Europe for naming years.

== Events ==
=== By place ===
==== Byzantium ====
- November 6 – The Walls of Constantinople are severely damaged by an earthquake, which destroys large parts of the structure, including 57 towers. The population is threatened by a plague. Emperor Theodosius II orders Constantine, praetorian prefect of the East, to supervise the repairs. He employs the city's demoi ("Circus factions") in the work, and rebuilds the walls within 60 days.
- The Huns, led by Attila, cross the Danube, and invade the Balkans as far as Thermopylae (Greece). During the invasion, Serdica (modern Sofia) is destroyed. For disobeying the terms of the treaty made in 442, Attila triples his demand for tribute to 2,100 pounds (ca. 700 kg) of gold per year; and the ransom for each Roman prisoner to 12 solidi.
- Theodosius II sends an embassy to Attila; Priscus of Panium, envoy for the Eastern Roman Empire. Priscus records one of the few eyewitness accounts of the Hun kingdom.
- Battle of the Utus: Attila defeats the Roman army near the river Utus (Vit, Bulgaria). The Huns are forced to abandon the siege of Constantinople. They march north and plunder the defenseless Balkan provinces (including Thrace, Scythia, Moesia, Dacia and Illyricum).
- Winter – Theodosius II chooses a policy to protect Constantinople against the Huns. He removes Aspar and Areobindus (magister militum) from their military commands.

==== Europe ====
- Vortigern, king of the Britons, receives the Saxon leaders Hengist and Horsa "as friends" and grants the brothers the Isle of Thanet, most easterly point of Kent (England).

=== By topic ===
==== Arts and Sciences ====
- The first entry in the Annales Cambriæ refers to this year.

==== Religion ====
- Germanus, bishop of Auxerre, makes his second visit to Britain.
- The Synod of Toledo (Spain) tries to add the filioque clause to the Nicene Creed. The Eastern Orthodox Church refuses to go along with this idea.

== Deaths ==
- Areobindus, Roman general (magister militum)
- Juqu Mujian, prince of the Chinese state Northern Liang
- Secundinus (or Seachnaill), patron saint
