= Areobindus =

Areobindus, also Ariobindas or Areovindas may refer to:

- Areobindus (consul 434) (died 449), consul in 434
- Areobindus Dagalaiphus Areobindus, grandson of the previous, consul in 506
- Areobindus (died 546), Byzantine general
