= 490th =

490th may refer to:

- 490th Bombardment Group, inactive United States Army Air Force unit
- 490th Fighter Squadron or 119th Fighter Squadron, flies the F-16C Fighting Falcon
- 490th Missile Squadron (490 MS), part of the 341st Missile Wing based at Malmstrom Air Force Base, Montana

== See also ==
- 490 (number)
- 490, the year 490 (CDXC) of the Julian calendar
- 490 BC
