= Walled Obelisk =

Roman monument in Constantinople (Istanbul, Turkey)

Coordinates: 41°00′19.43″N 28°58′29.44″E

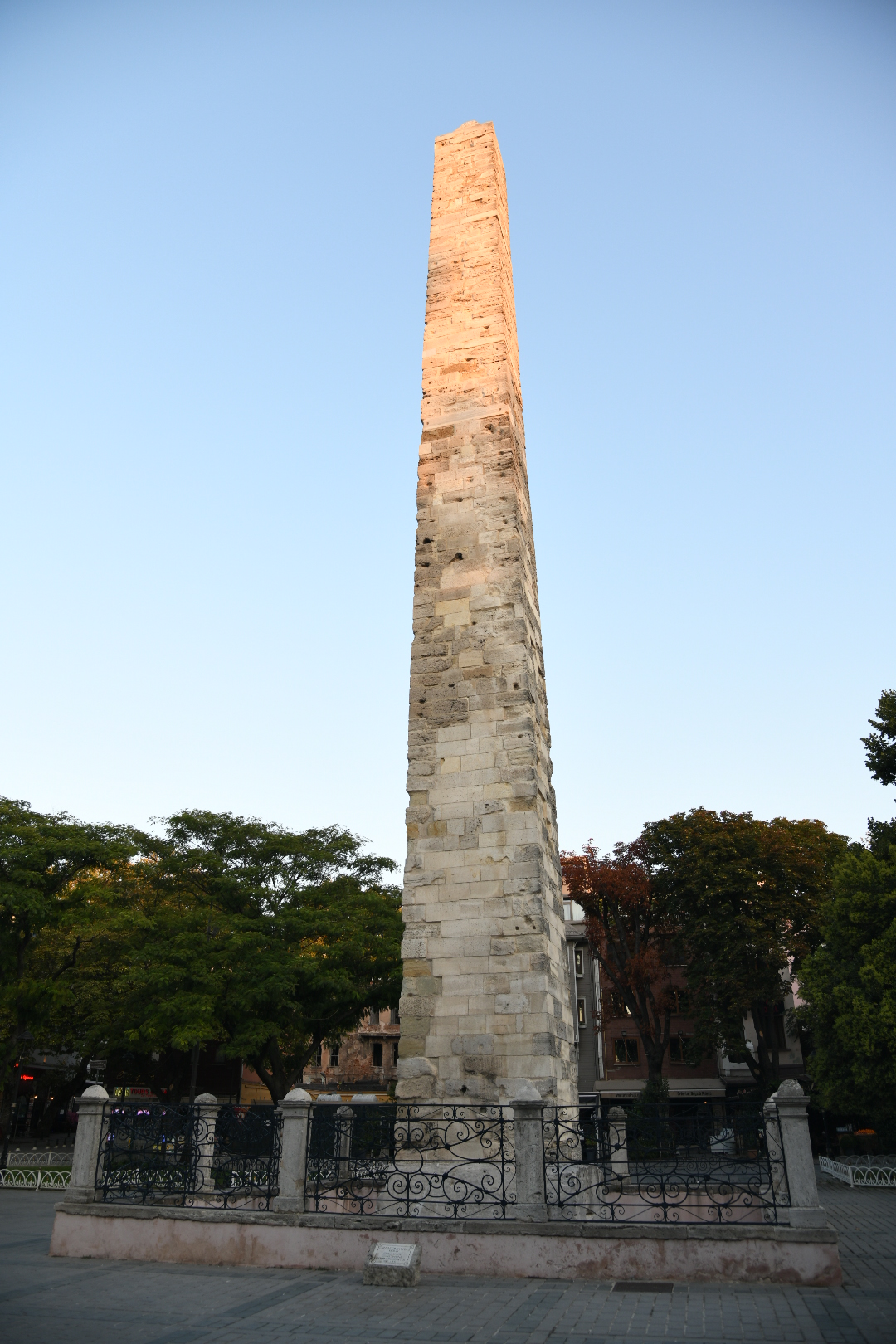
- The Walled Obelisk (after repairs), looking northwest.

- Location within Istanbul
- Location: Hippodrome of Constantinople (today Sultanahmet Square, Istanbul, Turkey)

The Walled Obelisk or Masonry Obelisk (Turkish: Örme Dikilitaş) is a Roman monument in the form of an obelisk in the former Hippodrome of Constantinople, now Sultanahmet Square in Istanbul, Turkey. It is situated west of the Sultan Ahmed Mosque, at the southern end of the ancient chariot-racing track of Constantinople's central barrier, beside the Obelisk of Theodosius and the Serpentine Column. Its original construction date in late antiquity is unknown, but it is sometimes named Constantine's Obelisk (Konstantin Dikilitaşı) after the inscription added by the Roman emperor Constantine VII Porphyrogenitus, who repaired it in the 10th century.

== History ==
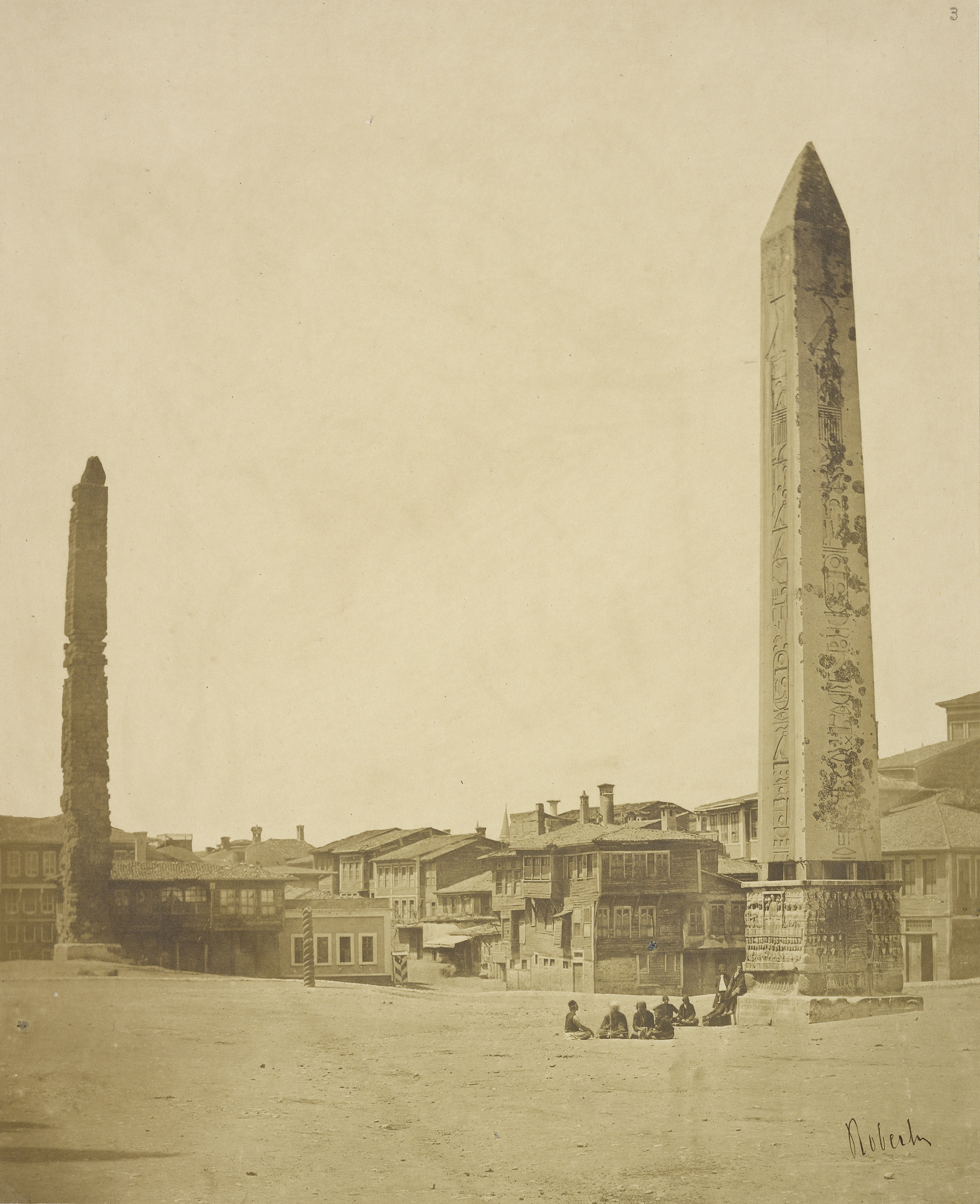
Walled Obelisk, (left) the Serpent Column (centre) and the Obelisk of Theodosius (right). At Meydanı (Hippodrome of Constantinople), 1853

The 32 m (105 ft)-high obelisk was most likely a Theodosian construction, built to mirror the Obelisk of Theodosius on the spina of the Roman circus of Constantinople; the Circus Maximus in Rome also had two obelisks on its spina.

The 10th-century emperor Constantine VII had the monument restored and coated with plates of gilt bronze; a Greek inscription in iambic trimeter was added at this time. The inscription mentions the repair works carried out by Constantine VII and compares it to the colossus in Rhodes. In addition to this the inscription also mentions the name of his son and successor, Romanos II.

By the 10th and 11th centuries, the obelisk was referred to as the 'tower of brass' in the medieval Arab world, although accounts sometimes confused it with the Obelisk of Theodosius. The late 12th-early 13th-century writer al-Harawi was the source for several Arabic geographers' inclusion of a detail about the monument: the Byzantines put potsherds and nuts amongst the masonry in order to see them crack when strong winds would cause the stones to shift.

At that time, it was decorated with gilded bronze plaques that portrayed the victories of Basil I, the grandfather of Constantine VII.

The obelisk's gilded bronze plaques were removed and melted down by the Fourth Crusaders in 1204.

Since young Janissaries liked to show their prowess by climbing the obelisk, the masonry suffered further damage to its surface.

The Walled Obelisk was depicted on the reverse of the Turkish 500 lira banknotes of 1953–1976.

== Inscription ==
The inscription in iambic trimeters commemorating the Obelisk's restoration by Constantine VII is as follows:

Τὸ τετρ[άπλευρον] θαῦμα τῶν μεταρσίων
χρόνῳ [φθαρὲν νῦν] Κωνσταντῖνος δεσπότης
οὗ Ῥωμ[αν]ὸς παῖς δόξα τῆς σκηπτουχίας
κρεῖττον νε[ο]υργεῖ [τῆς πά]λαι θεωρίας·
ὁ γὰρ κολοσσὸς θ[άμ]βος ἦν ἐν τῇ Ῥόδῳ
καὶ χαλκὸς οὗτος θάμβος ἐστὶν ἐνθάδε.

Translation:

The four-sided marvel of the uplifted,
wasted by time, now Constantine the Emperor,
whose son is Romanus, the glory of the kingship,
restores better than the ancient spectacle.
For the Colossus was a wonder once in Rhodes,
and this is now a brazen wonder here.

== Bibliography ==
- Iversen, Erik (1972). Obelisks in Exile, volume II: The Obelisks of Istanbul and England. Copenhagen: G. E. C. Gad. ISBN 87-12-35883-5. OCLC 462820.
- "The Walled Obelisk". Government of Istanbul. Archived from the original on 2006-09-12.
- "The Walled Obelisk". Hotelle.com. Archived from the original on 2006-09-04.
