= Leontius of Trier =

Bishop of Trier (414–445)

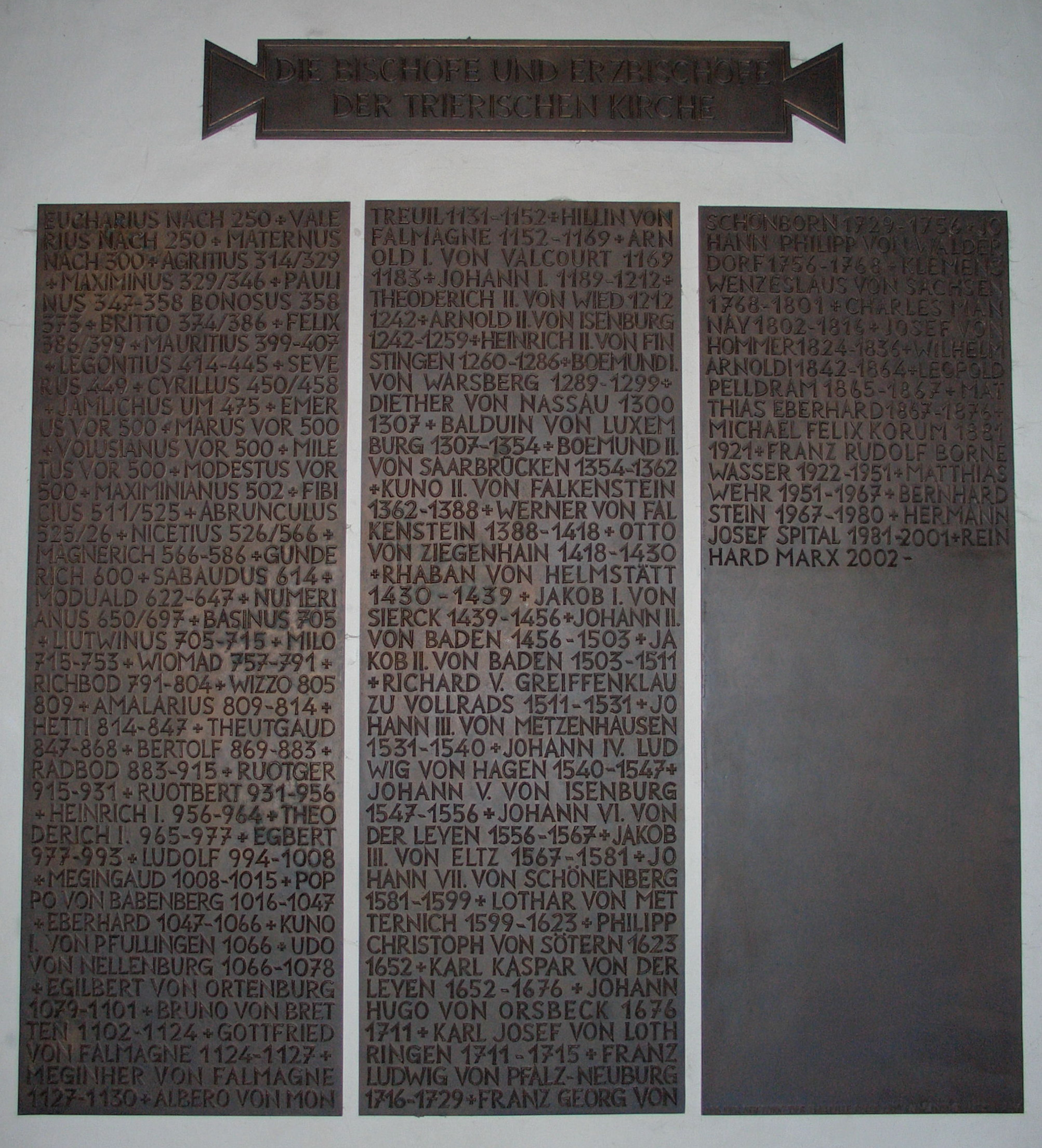
Tabula Episcoporum Trevirensium.

Leontius of Trier (died 19 February 446) was bishop of Trier from 414 to 445.

Very little is known of his life but he is one of a number of bishops in that time. The rapid succession of Bishop names in the 5th century indicates the troubled times in the period of transition from the Roman Empire to Frankish rule in Trier. Trier itself was taken in 496 by the Franks.
