= Guṇabhadra =

Guṇabhadra may refer to:

- Guṇabhadra (Buddhist monk) (394–468)
- Guṇabhadra (Jain monk) (fl. late 9th – early 10th century CE)
