= Zong Bing =

Chinese artist and musician

Zong Bing (Chinese: 宗炳; Wade–Giles: Tsung^{1} Ping^{3}, style name Shaowen 少文, 375 – 443) was a Chinese artist and musician who wrote the earliest text on landscape painting. He wrote that “Landscapes have a material existence, and yet reach also in a spiritual domain.”
