= 490 =

Calendar year

490 in various calendars
- Gregorian calendar: 490; CDXC
- Ab urbe condita: 1243
- Assyrian calendar: 5240
- Balinese saka calendar: 411–412
- Bengali calendar: −104 – −103
- Berber calendar: 1440
- Buddhist calendar: 1034
- Burmese calendar: −148
- Byzantine calendar: 5998–5999
- Chinese calendar: 己巳年 (Earth Snake); 3187 or 2980 — to — 庚午年 (Metal Horse); 3188 or 2981
- Coptic calendar: 206–207
- Discordian calendar: 1656
- Ethiopian calendar: 482–483
- Hebrew calendar: 4250–4251
- Hindu calendars
- Vikram Samvat: 546–547
- Shaka Samvat: 411–412
- Kali Yuga: 3590–3591
- Holocene calendar: 10490
- Iranian calendar: 132 BP – 131 BP
- Islamic calendar: 136 BH – 135 BH
- Javanese calendar: 376–377
- Julian calendar: 490; CDXC
- Korean calendar: 2823
- Minguo calendar: 1422 before ROC 民前1422年
- Nanakshahi calendar: −978
- Seleucid era: 801/802 AG
- Thai solar calendar: 1032–1033
- Tibetan calendar: ས་མོ་སྦྲུལ་ལོ་ (female Earth-Snake); 616 or 235 or −537 — to — ལྕགས་ཕོ་རྟ་ལོ་ (male Iron-Horse); 617 or 236 or −536

Year 490 (CDXC) was a common year starting on Monday of the Julian calendar. At the time, it was known as the Year of the Consulship of Faustus and Longinus (or, less frequently, year 1243 Ab urbe condita). The denomination 490 for this year has been used since the early medieval period, when the Anno Domini calendar era became the prevalent method in Europe for naming years.

== Events ==
=== By place ===
==== Europe ====
- Spring – Odoacer receives reinforcements from the south and leaves Ravenna. He defeats the Ostrogoths near Faenza.
- King Theodoric the Great retreats to Ticinum (modern Pavia), where he constructs a fortified camp, which is blockaded.
- Summer – The Burgundians, under King Gundobad, cross the Alps and plunder Liguria. Many Romans are taken into captivity.
- King Alaric II supports Theodoric in his conquest of Italy, by dispatching a Visigoth army to raise Odoacer's siege of Pavia.
- August 11 – Battle of the Adda River: Theodoric and his ally Alaric II defeat the forces of Odoacer, on the Adda River, near Milan.
- Theodoric and his Ostrogoths lay siege to Ravenna. The cities of Cesena and Rimini retain their allegiance to Odoacer.

==== Asia ====
- Empress Feng of the Chinese Northern Wei Dynasty dies. She is buried with magnificent honors, in the Wenming Tomb.
- In Jiaozhou, a state official Phục Đăng Chi launched a coup d'etat against the governor Phòng Pháp Thặng and captured him. In November, emperor Wu appointed Phục Đăng Chi as the new Jiaozhou's governor.

=== By topic ===
==== Religion ====
- Euphemius becomes patriarch of Constantinople.

== Births ==
- May 3 – Kʼan Joy Chitam I, ruler of Palenque (d. 565)
- John Philoponus, Aristotelian commentator and philosopher (d. 570)
- Romanos the Melodist, Syrian poet (approximate date)
- Vigilantia, Byzantine princess (approximate date)

== Deaths ==
- Feng, Chinese empress and regent of Northern Wei (b. 442)
- Peter III Mongus, patriarch of Alexandria
- Theodora of Alexandria, Desert Mother
