= AD 442 =

442 in various calendars
Gregorian calendar	442; CDXLII
Ab urbe condita	1195
Assyrian calendar	5192
Balinese saka calendar	363–364
Bengali calendar	−152 – −151
Berber calendar	1392
Buddhist calendar	986
Burmese calendar	−196
Byzantine calendar	5950–5951
Chinese calendar	辛巳年 (Metal Snake); 3139 or 2932 — to — 壬午年 (Water Horse); 3140 or 2933
Coptic calendar	158–159
Discordian calendar	1608
Ethiopian calendar	434–435
Hebrew calendar	4202–4203
- Hindu calendars
Vikram Samvat	498–499
Shaka Samvat	363–364
Kali Yuga	3542–3543
Holocene calendar	10442
Iranian calendar	180 BP – 179 BP
Islamic calendar	186 BH – 185 BH
Javanese calendar	326–327
Julian calendar	442; CDXLII
Korean calendar	2775
Minguo calendar	1470 before ROC 民前1470年
Nanakshahi calendar	−1026
Seleucid era	753/754 AG
Thai solar calendar	984–985
Tibetan calendar	ལྕགས་མོ་སྦྲུལ་ལོ་ (female Iron-Snake); 568 or 187 or −585 — to — ཆུ་ཕོ་རྟ་ལོ་ (male Water-Horse); 569 or 188 or −584

Year 442 (CDXLII) was a common year starting on Thursday of the Julian calendar. At the time, it was known as the Year of the Consulship of Dioscorus and Eudoxius (or, less frequently, year 1195 Ab urbe condita). The denomination 442 for this year has been used since the early medieval period, when the Anno Domini calendar era became the prevalent method in Europe for naming years.

== Events ==
=== By place ===
==== Europe ====
- Valentinian III forms a marriage proposal for his eldest daughter Eudocia and Genseric's son Huneric. He is already married to a Visigoth princess, and Genseric decides to free him of his obligations by accusing her of trying to poison him. He leaves her mutilated - her ears and nose are cut off - and sends her back to her father Theodoric I, in Toulouse (Gaul).
- The Huns, on a military campaign along the Danube and the Great Morava, destroy the city of Naissus (modern Serbia). They have mastered siege technology and are able to capture fortified cities. The Roman Senate agrees to pay Attila a tribute of 700 pounds of gold per year.

==== Africa ====
- End of the Vandal War (439-442): Emperor Valentinian III signs a peace treaty with King Genseric, and recognises the Vandal Kingdom. He grants him sovereignty over most of Africa. Genseric gives back Sicily and Mauretania (Algeria and Morocco). This marks the end of the Vandal migrations; they settle in North Africa, with Carthage as their capital.

=== By topic ===
==== Religion ====
- The Monastery of St. Shenouda the Archimandrite (White Monastery) near Sohag (Egypt) is built.

== Births ==
- Feng, Chinese empress and regent of the Northern Wei dynasty (d. 490)
- Isidore of Miletus, Byzantine architect and mathematician (d. 537)
- Placidia, Roman empress and daughter of Valentinian III (approximate date)

== Deaths ==
- Veh Mihr Shapur, Sasanian military officer and Marzban of Armenia
