= Areobindus (consul 434) =

Flavius Areobindus (died 449) was a general of the Eastern Roman Empire, second generation of Barbarian incorporation of Gothic origin, who became commander in chief of the East. He led battles and conquests on multiple fronts of the allegedly stable Eastern Roman Empire. In addition, due to his military efforts, he was awarded the consulate in 434 along with his co-consul, Aspar. He would hold his magister millitum position until his death in 449. He is the beginning of a distinguished line of nobles through his group's admission into the Eastern Roman Empire.

== Biography ==
Areobindus was a Goth who became part of the political class of the Eastern Roman Empire. His son Dagalaifus was consul in 461, his grandson Areobindus Dagalaifus Areobindus held the consulate in 506.

He took part in the war of 422 against the Sasanian forces of king Bahram V, with the rank of comes foederatorum, or commander of the contingent of barbarians fighting as allies in the Roman army. On that occasion Areobindus defeated one of the Sasanians, Ardazanes, in a duel (mard o mard), and, following his victory, the peace was concluded. John Malalas, chronographer of such events as Areobindus' duel, had become widely respected as a source for the common people.^{4}

In 434, due to his military efforts against the Sasanians, Areobindus was chosen by the Eastern court as consul along with Aspar. Aspar was later criticized by scholars for his incompetency as a consul, his vying for power sabotaging his potential good impacts.^{5} In the same year he was appointed magister militum per Orientem (perhaps praesentialis), a position he held until his death. In 441 he was chosen by Theodosius II as one of the commanders of the expedition against the Vandals in Africa; the expedition was not successful because its leaders wasted time in Sicily. In 443 he was sent along with other generals against Attila, but he was defeated by the king of the Huns. In 447 he received the title of patricius, but by the year of his death Areobindus had fallen into disfavor with Theodosius II.^{6}

Areobindus was the recipient of two letters of Theodoret of Cyrrhus, which show that he had lands in that city, among others attested in Euphratensis.

== Epitome of shifting power ==
Example of the East's Instability

As the division between Western Rome and Eastern Rome grew, now the "Byzantine Empire", general sentiment holds that while the Western empire was weakening and falling apart, the Byzantines remained politically and economically strong. However, in the 440s, Areobindus was sent on three separate expeditions covering both fronts of the Eastern empire. This calls into question the alleged stability and paints Eastern Rome as perhaps less stable than commonly perceived.^{7}

The first of these expeditions was, as mentioned previously, in 422 against the Sasanids of King Bahram V, to the east. This would come to be known as the Roman-Sasanian War of 421-22. Though the chronography of John Malalas claims the war was concluded through a duel in which Areobindus participated in and won, according to Edward Gibbon, author of The Decline and Fall of the Roman Empire, the war was concluded by negotiation from Helios to return to a status quo ante bellum. Despite the initial alleged religious reasoning for beginning the war, the fact that the Byzantine Empire was maintaining a war they instigated calls to less of a desire to remain stable and more of a reckless decision in a fragile state.

The second and third of these conflicts push the instability in the north and south of Byzantium, in Areobindus' involvements in expeditions against both the Vandals in Africa and Attila the Hun in what is now modern-day Russia.^{8}

Barbarian Incorporation

Important to note about Areobindus is the fact that while he was a Goth, the incorporation of barbarian groups had already occurred over a century ago.^{9} The different barbarian groups, take the Ostrogoths, Goths, etc., are more so artificially grouped ignoring enormous amounts of diversity between and within groups. This, in addition to the already massive diversity of Rome's sheer size allowed different groups to approach Rome in different ways.^{10} While some were foreign gentes, settling into the Roman Empire, others formed more of a warband, sticking to the old-fashioned view of barbarians.^{11}

Diminishing Importance of Consuls

Areobindus is representative of an oncoming massive shift in political structure. With the reign of Justinian I only a few decades away, Areobindus is one of the last consuls to exist at a time when consuls were slightly more than just a ceremonial position. While the consulate position was never one to be specifically powerful, Areobindus does mark the continued trend of lost power. Further down the line, with his son Dagalaifus and grandson Areobindus, they lean even further into the consulate position becoming less involved in politics with the recovery of no less than seven ivory diptychs^{12} that help to reveal the incoming ceremonial nature of consuls. After Justinian I came into power, the shifting political system also brought with it a lesser seen instability.

== Bibliography ==
- In the sources are reported also the forms Ariobindus, Ariovindus and Arivendus.
- According to some scholars, however, the rank was not comes foederatorum, but comes rei militaris (Irfan Shahîd, Byzantium and the Arabs in the fifth century, Dumbarton Oaks, 1989, ISBN 0-88402-152-1, p. 53). 3.
- 3. Malalas, John. Chronographia. Translated by Brady Kiesling. Cedrenus, Historiarum Compendius, 599.
- 4. Treadgold, Warren. "The Byzantine World Histories of John Malalas and Eustathius of Epiphania." The International History Review 29 (2007): 709–45.
- 5. Pigoński, Łukasz. "View of Berichus and the Evidence for Aspar's Political Power and Aims in the Last Years of Theodosius II's Reign." Studia Ceranea. Journal of the Waldemar Ceran Research Centre for the History and Culture of the Mediterranean Area and South-East Europe 8 (December):237-51. doi:10.18778/2084-140X.08.13
- 6. Jones, Arnold Hugh Martin, Martindale, John Robert, & Morris, John. Prosopography of the Later Roman Empire. Cambridge: Cambridge University Press, 1992. ISBN 0-521-20159-4, pp. 145–146.
- 7. Treadgold, Warren. "The Persistence of Byzantium." The Wilson Quarterly (1998): 22 (4): 66–91.
- 8. Haas, Christopher. "Embassy to Attila: Priscus of Panium". Villanova University. Archived from the original on 21 February 2014.
- 9. Cameron, Alan. "The Origin, Context and Function of Consular Diptychs." Journal of Roman Studies 103 (November 2013): 174–207. doi:10.1017/S0075435813000099.
- 10. Peters, Edward & Frassetto, Michael. "History of Europe - Barbarian Migrations, Invasions | Britannica." n.d. Accessed November 2, 2023. https://www.britannica.com/topic/history-of-Europe/Barbarian-migrations-and-invasions.
- 11. Guy Halsall. "The Barbarian invasions", In Paul Fouracre (ed.). The New Cambridge Medieval History, Vol. 1: c. 500 – c. 700. Cambridge: Cambridge University Press, 2008.
- 12. Merrills, Andy and Miles, Richard. The Vandals (Wiley-Blackwell, 2014).

Preceded by Theodosius Augustus XIV; Petronius Maximus	Roman consul 434 with Flavius Ardabur Aspar	Succeeded by Theodosius Augustus XV; Valentinianus Augustus IV
