= Vandalic War =

Byzantine–Vandal war in North Africa (533–534)

- Part of Justinian's wars of Reconquest
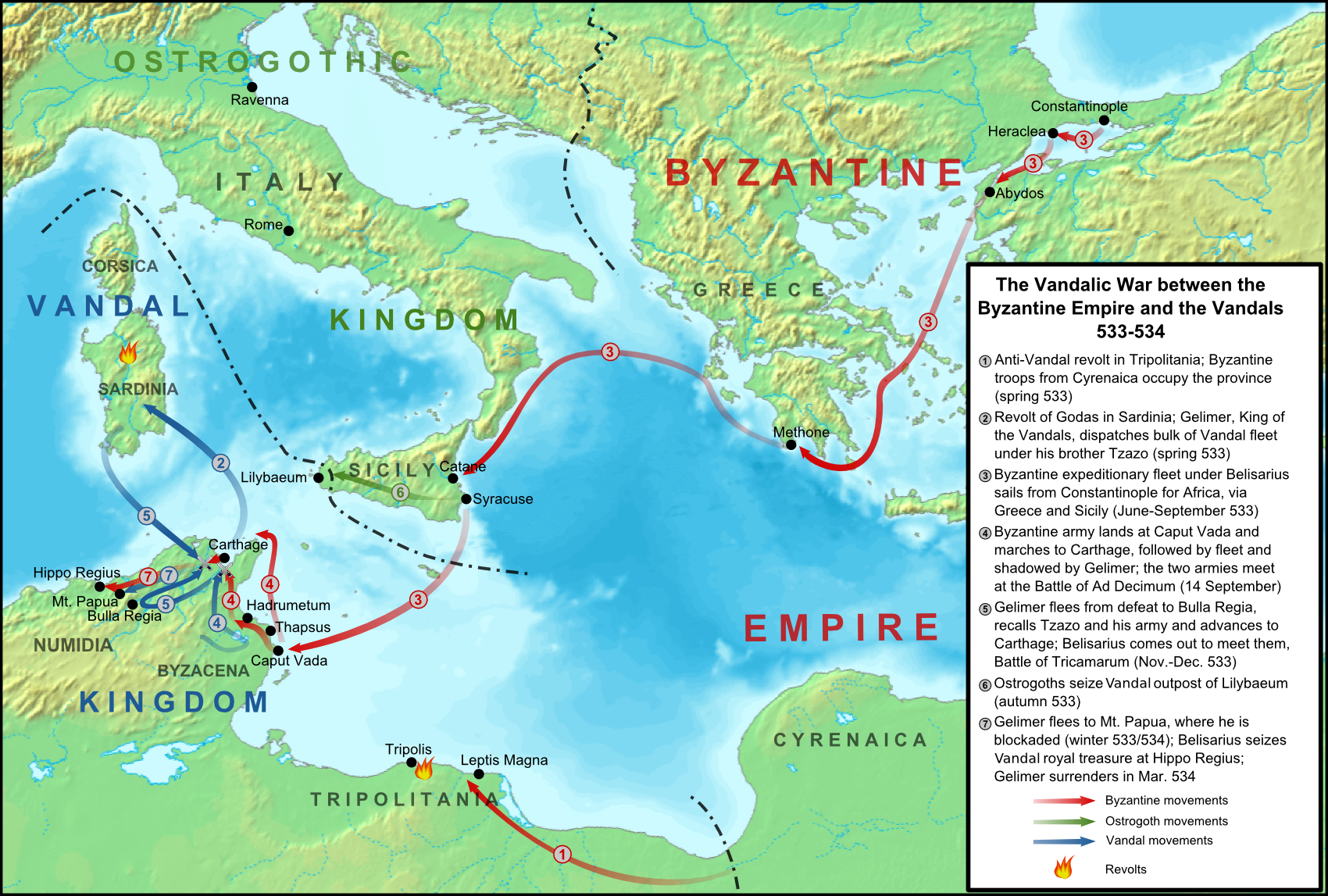
- Campaign map of the war
Date	June 533 – March 534
Location	North Africa, Sardinia
Result	Byzantine victory
Territorial changes	Byzantines annex Vandal territory; Establishment of Byzantine North Africa

Belligerents
Byzantine Empire	Vandal Kingdom

Commanders and leaders
Belisarius; Calonymus; John the Armenian X; Solomon	Gelimer (surrendered) (POW); Tzazo †; Ammatus †; Gibamund †

Strength
10,000 infantry; 5,000–7,000 cavalry	30,000, mostly cavalry

The Vandalic War (533–534) was a conflict fought in North Africa between the forces of the Byzantine Empire (also known as the Eastern Roman Empire) and the Germanic Vandal Kingdom. It was the first war of Emperor Justinian I's Renovatio imperii Romanorum, wherein the Byzantines attempted to reassert Roman sovereignty over territory formerly controlled by the Western Roman Empire.

The Vandals occupied Roman North Africa in the early 5th century and established an independent kingdom there. Under their king, Geiseric, the Vandal navy carried out pirate attacks across the Mediterranean, sacked Rome in 455, and defeated a Roman invasion in 468 at Cape Bon. After Geiseric's death in 477, relations with the Eastern Roman Empire were normalized, although tensions flared up occasionally due to the Vandals' adherence to Arianism and their persecution of the Nicene native population. In 530, a palace coup occurred in Carthage due to a defeat against a local chief of the Frexes tribe Antalas, for which Gelimer blamed Hilderic, and the Vandals overthrew the pro-Roman Hilderic and replaced him with his cousin Gelimer. The Eastern Roman emperor Justinian took this as a pretext to intervene in Vandal affairs, and after securing the eastern frontier with Sassanid Persia in 532, he began preparing an expedition under general Belisarius, whose secretary Procopius wrote the main historical narrative of the war. Justinian took advantage of rebellions in the remote Vandal provinces of Sardinia and Tripolitania. These not only distracted Gelimer from Justinian's preparations but significantly weakened Vandal defenses through the dispatch of the bulk of the Vandal navy and army under Gelimer's brother Tzazo to Sardinia.

The Byzantine expeditionary force set sail from Constantinople in late June 533, and after a sea voyage along the coasts of Greece and southern Italy, landed on the African coast at Caputvada in early September, catching Gelimer completely by surprise. The Vandal king hastily gathered his forces and met the Roman army at the Battle of Ad Decimum, near Carthage, on 13 September. Gelimer's elaborate plan to encircle and destroy the Roman army came close to success, but Belisarius drove the Vandal army into flight and occupied Carthage. Gelimer withdrew to Bulla Regia, where he gathered his remaining strength, including the army of Tzazo, which returned from Sardinia. In December, Gelimer advanced towards Carthage and met the Romans at the Battle of Tricamarum. The battle resulted in a Roman victory and the death of Tzazo. Gelimer fled to a remote mountain fortress, where he was blockaded until he surrendered in the spring.

Belisarius returned to Constantinople with the Vandals' royal treasury and the captive Gelimer to enjoy a triumph, while Africa was formally restored to imperial rule as the praetorian prefecture of Africa. Imperial control scarcely reached beyond the old Vandal kingdom; however, peace was restored and the Roman government firmly established.

== Background ==
=== Establishment of the Vandalic Kingdom ===
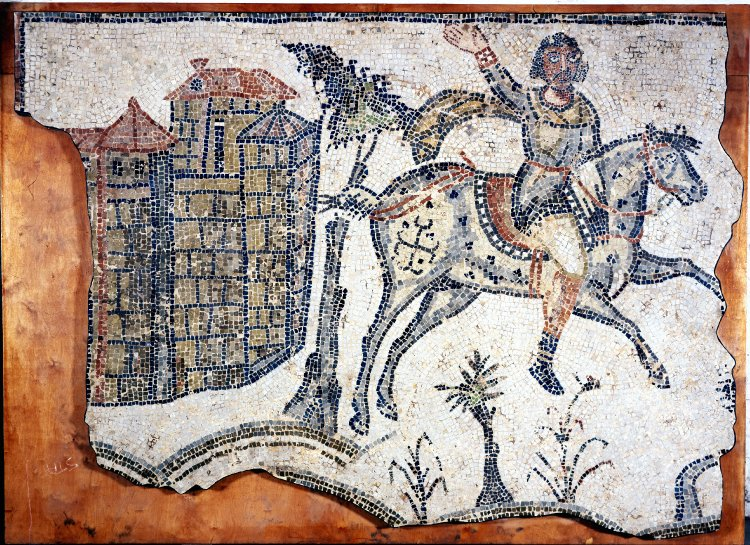
Mosaic of a Vandal horseman, Carthage, c. 500

In the course of the gradual decline and dissolution of the Western Roman Empire in the early 5th century, the Germanic tribe of the Vandals, allied with the Alans, had established themselves in the Iberian Peninsula. In 429, the Roman governor of the Diocese of Africa, Bonifacius, who had rebelled against the West Roman emperor Valentinian III (r. 425–455) and was facing an invasion by imperial troops, called upon the Vandalic King Geiseric for aid. Thus, in May 429, Geiseric crossed the Straits of Gibraltar with his entire people, reportedly 80,000 in total.

Geiseric's Vandals and Alans, however, had their own plans, and aimed to conquer the African provinces outright. Their possession of Mauretania Caesariensis, Mauretania Sitifensis and most of Numidia was recognized in 435 by the Western Roman court, but this was only a temporary expedient. Warfare soon recommenced, and in October 439, the capital of Africa, Carthage, fell to the Vandals. In 442, another treaty exchanged the provinces hitherto held by the Vandals with the core of the African diocese, the rich provinces of Zeugitana and Byzacena, which the Vandals received no longer as foederati of the Empire, but as their own possessions. These events marked the foundation of the Vandalic Kingdom, as the Vandals made Carthage their capital and settled around it.

Although the Vandals thus gained control of the lucrative African grain trade with Italy, they also launched raids on the coasts of the Mediterranean that ranged as far as the Aegean Sea and culminated in their sack of Rome itself in 455, which allegedly lasted for two weeks. Taking advantage of the chaos that followed Valentinian's death in 455, Geiseric then regained control—albeit rather tenuous—of the Mauretanian provinces, and with his fleet took over Sardinia, Corsica and the Balearic Islands. Sicily barely escaped the same fate through the presence there of Ricimer.

Throughout this period, the Vandals survived several Roman attempts at a counterstrike: the Eastern Roman general Aspar had led an unsuccessful expedition in 431, an expedition assembled by the Western emperor Majorian (r. 457–461) off the coast of Spain in 460 was scattered or captured by the Vandals before it could set sail, and finally, in 468, Geiseric defeated a huge joint expedition by both western and eastern empires under Basiliscus. In the aftermath of this disaster, and following further Vandal raids against the shores of Greece, the eastern emperor Zeno (r. 474–491) concluded a "perpetual peace" with Geiseric (474/476).

=== Roman–Vandal relations until 533 ===
The Vandal state was unique in many respects among the Germanic kingdoms that succeeded the Western Roman Empire: instead of respecting and continuing the established Roman socio-political order, they completely replaced it with their own. Whereas the kings of Western Europe continued to pay deference to the emperors and minted coinage with their portraits, the Vandal kings portrayed themselves as fully independent rulers. The Vandals also consciously differentiated themselves from the native Romano-African population through their continued use of their native language and peculiar dress, which emphasized their distinct social position as the elite of the kingdom. In addition, the Vandals, who were, like most Germanics, adherents of Arianism, persecuted the Chalcedonian majority of the local population, especially in the reigns of Huneric (r. 477–484) and Gunthamund (r. 484–496). The emperors at Constantinople protested at this, but the peace held for almost sixty years, and relations were often friendly, especially between Emperor Anastasius I (r. 491–518) and Thrasamund (r. 496–523), who largely ceased the persecutions.

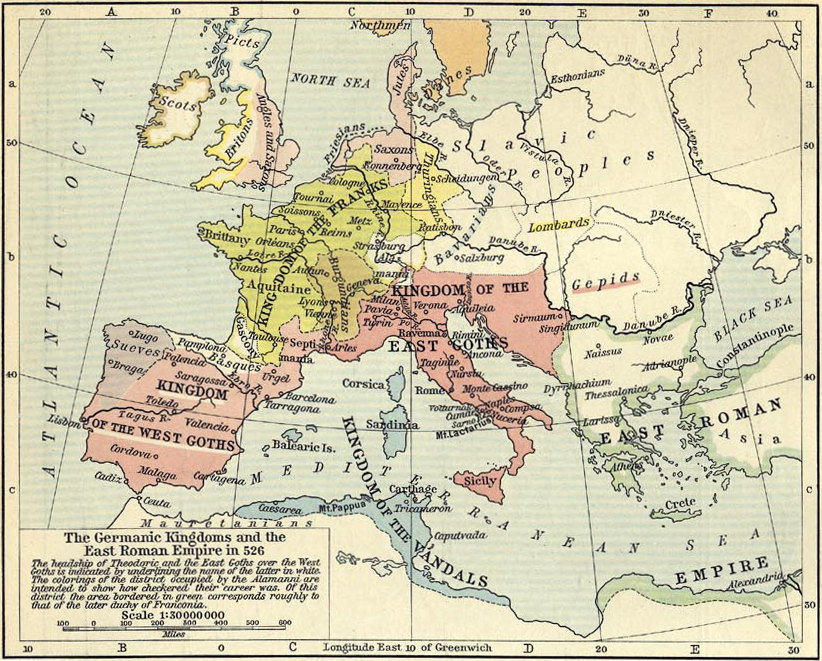
Map of the East Roman Empire and the Germanic kingdoms of the western Mediterranean in 526

In 523, Hilderic (r. 523–530), the son of Huneric, ascended the throne at Carthage. Himself a descendant of Valentinian III, Hilderic re-aligned his kingdom and brought it closer to the Roman Empire: according to the account of Procopius (The Vandalic War, I.9) he was an unwarlike, amiable person, who ceased the persecution of the Chalcedonians, exchanged gifts and embassies with Justinian I (r. 527–565) even before the latter's rise to the throne, and even replaced his own image in his coins with that of the emperor. Justinian evidently hoped that this rapprochement would lead to the peaceful subordination of the Vandal state to his empire. However, Hilderic's pro-Roman policies, coupled with a defeat suffered against the Mauri in Byzacena, led to opposition among the Vandal nobility, which resulted in his overthrow and imprisonment in 530 by his cousin, Gelimer (r. 530–534). Justinian seized the opportunity, demanding Hilderic's restoration, with Gelimer predictably refusing. Justinian then demanded Hilderic's release to Constantinople, threatening war otherwise. Gelimer was unwilling to surrender a rival claimant to Justinian, who could use him to stir up trouble in his kingdom, and probably expected war to come either way, according to J.B. Bury. He consequently refused Justinian's demand on the grounds that this was an internal matter among the Vandals.

Justinian now had his pretext, and with peace restored on his eastern frontier with Sassanid Persia in 532, he started assembling an invasion force. According to Procopius (The Vandalic War, I.10), the news of Justinian's decision to go to war with the Vandals caused great consternation among the capital's elites, in whose minds the disaster of 468 was still fresh. The financial officials resented the expenditure involved, while the military was weary from the Persian war and feared the Vandals' sea-power. The emperor's scheme received support mostly from the Church, reinforced by the arrival of victims of renewed persecutions from Africa. Only the powerful minister John the Cappadocian dared to openly voice his opposition to the expedition, however, and Justinian disregarded it and pressed on with his preparations.

=== Diplomatic preparations and revolts in Tripolitania and Sardinia ===
Soon after his seizure of power, Gelimer's domestic position began to deteriorate, as he persecuted his political enemies among the Vandal nobility, confiscating their property and executing many of them. These actions undermined his already doubtful legitimacy in the eyes of many, and contributed to the outbreak of two revolts in remote provinces of the Vandal kingdom: in Sardinia, where the local governor, Godas, declared himself an independent ruler, and shortly after in Tripolitania, where the native population, led by a certain Pudentius, rebelled against Vandal rule. Although Procopius' narrative makes both uprisings seem coincidental, Ian Hughes points out the fact that both rebellions broke out shortly before the commencement of the Roman expedition against the Vandals, and that both Godas and Pudentius immediately asked for assistance from Justinian, as evidence of an active diplomatic involvement by the Emperor in their preparation.

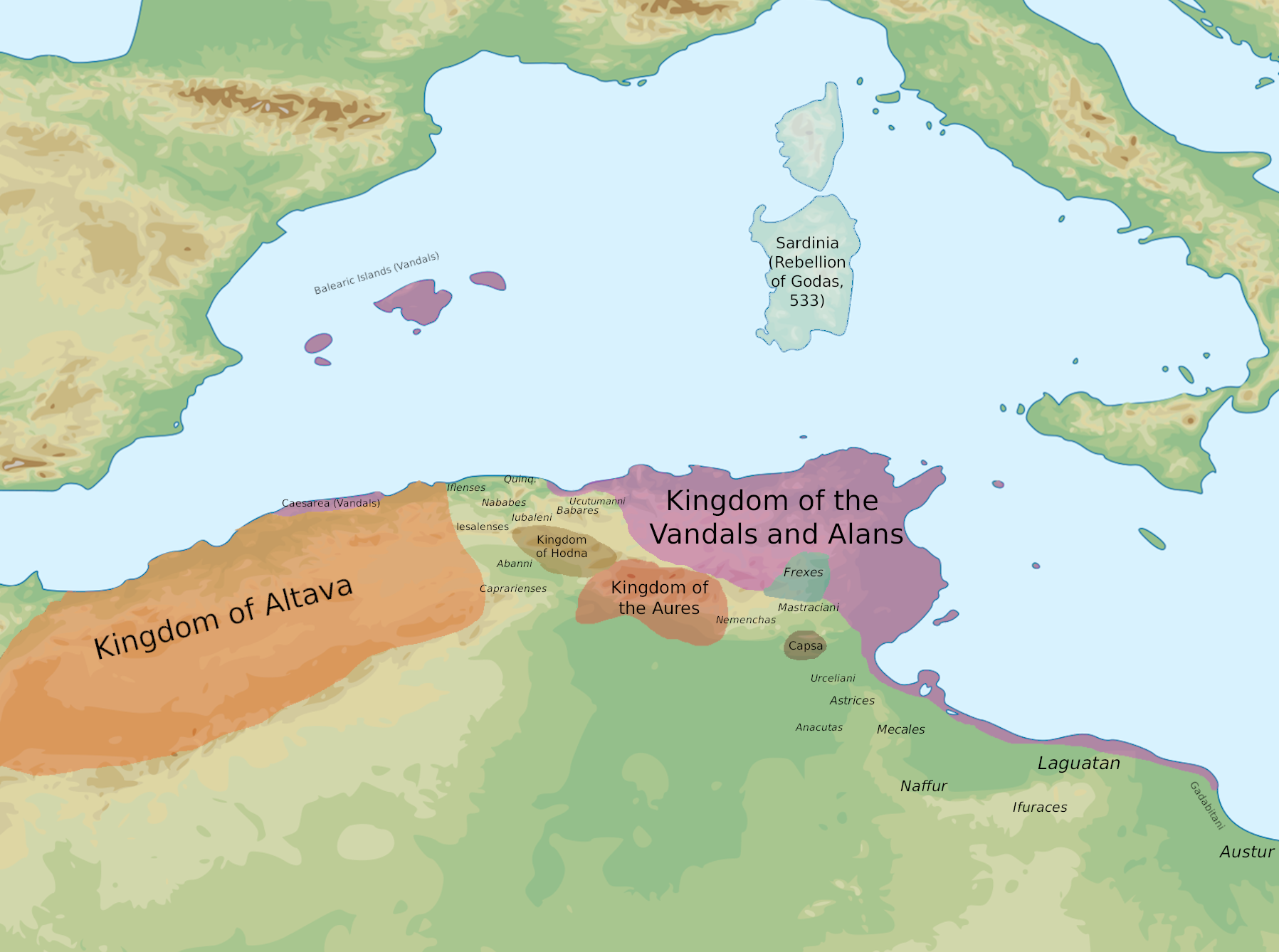
Map of the Vandal kingdom and surrounding Berber polities, tribes and revolts on the eve of the Byzantine invasion in 533.

In response to Godas' emissaries, Justinian detailed Cyril, one of the officers of the foederati, with 400 men, to accompany the invasion fleet and then sail on to Sardinia. Gelimer reacted to Godas' rebellion by sending the bulk of his fleet, 120 of his best vessels, and 5,000 men under his own brother Tzazon, to suppress it. The Vandal king's decision played a crucial role in the outcome of the war, for it removed from the scene the Vandal navy, the main obstacle to a Roman landing in Africa, as well as a large part of his army. Gelimer also chose to ignore the revolt in Tripolitania for the moment, as it was both a lesser threat and more remote, while his lack of manpower constrained him to await Tzazon's return from Sardinia before undertaking further campaigns. At the same time, both rulers tried to win over allies: Gelimer contacted the Visigoth king Theudis (r. 531–548) and proposed an alliance, while Justinian secured the benevolent neutrality and support of the Ostrogothic Kingdom of Italy, which had strained relations with the Vandals over the ill treatment of the Ostrogoth princess Amalafrida, the wife of Thrasamund. The Ostrogoth court readily agreed to allow the Roman invasion fleet to use the harbor of Syracuse in Sicily and establish a market for the provisioning of the Roman troops there.

=== Opposing forces ===
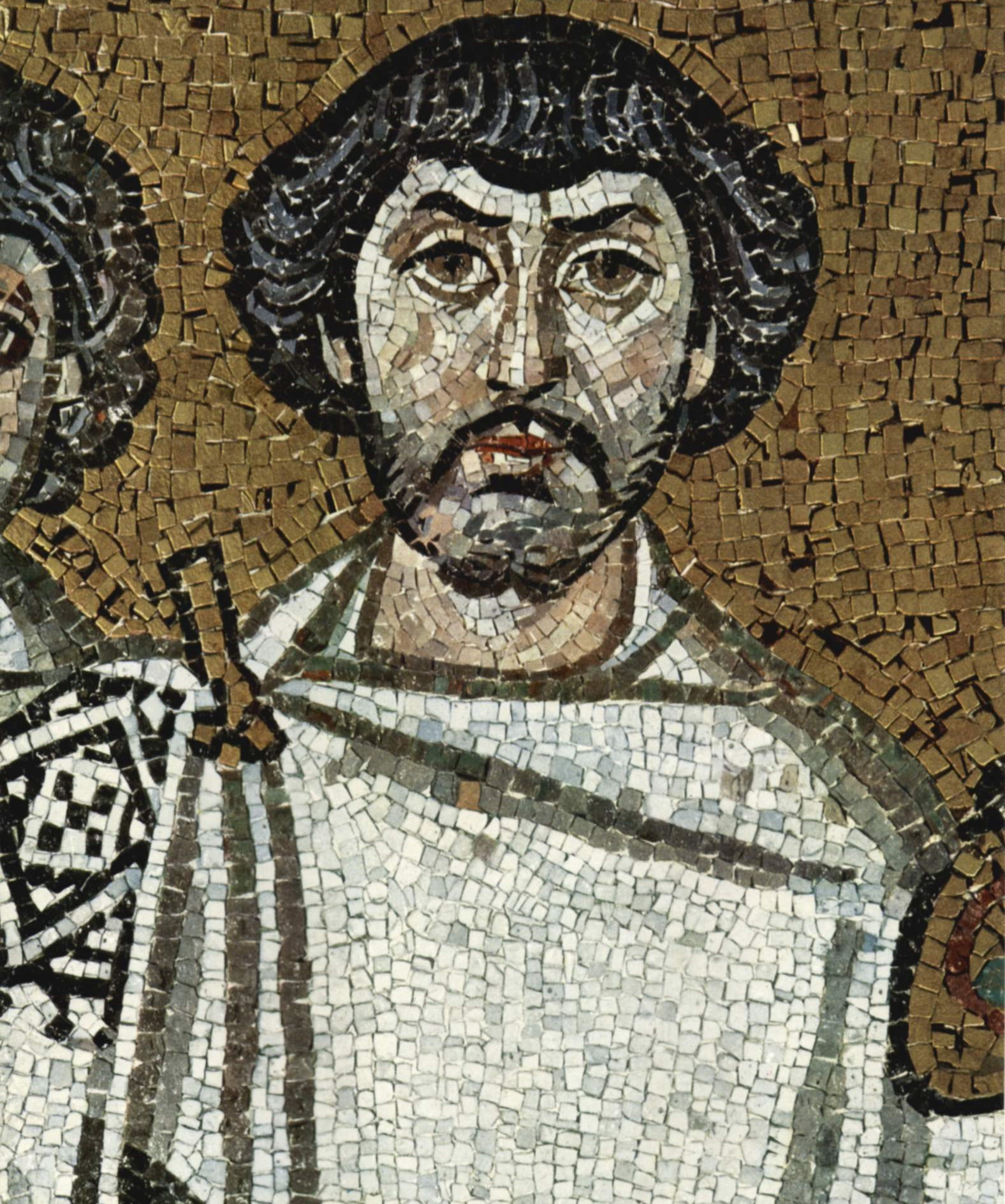
A member of the retinue of Emperor Justinian I in the mosaic in the Church of San Vitale, Ravenna, which is usually identified with Belisarius

Justinian selected General Belisarius, who had recently distinguished himself against the Persians and in the suppression of the Nika riots, to lead the expedition. As Ian Hughes points out, Belisarius was also eminently suited for this appointment for two other reasons: he was a native Latin speaker, and was solicitous of the welfare of the local population, keeping a tight leash on his troops. Both these qualities would be crucial in winning support from the Latin-speaking African population. Belisarius was accompanied by his wife, Antonina, and by Procopius, his secretary, who wrote the history of the war.

According to Procopius (The Vandalic War, I.11), the army consisted of 10,000 infantry, partly drawn from the field army (comitatenses) and partly from among the foederati, as well as 5,000 cavalry. There were also some 1,500–2,000 of Belisarius' own retainers (bucellarii), an elite corps (it is unclear if their number is included in the 5,000 cavalry mentioned as a total figure by Procopius). In addition, there were two additional bodies of allied troops, both mounted archers, 600 Huns and 400 Heruls. The army was led by an array of experienced officers. The eunuch Solomon was chosen as Belisarius' chief of staff (domesticus) and the former praetorian prefect Archelaus was placed in charge of the army's provisioning, while Rufinus the Thracian and Aïgan the Hun led the cavalry. The whole force was transported on 500 vessels manned by 30,000 sailors under admiral Calonymus of Alexandria, guarded by ninety-two dromon warships. The traditional view, as expressed by J.B. Bury, is that the expeditionary force was remarkably small for the task, especially given the military reputation of the Vandals, and that perhaps it reflects the limit of the fleet's carrying capacity, or perhaps it was an intentional move to limit the impact of any defeat. Ian Hughes, however, comments that even in comparison with the armies of the early Roman Empire, Belisarius' army was a "large, well-balanced force capable of overcoming the Vandals and may have contained a higher proportion of high quality, reliable troops than the armies stationed in the east".

On the Vandal side, the picture is less clear. The Vandal army was not a professional and mostly volunteer force like the East Roman army, but comprised every able-bodied male of the Vandal people. Hence modern estimates on the available forces vary along with estimates on the total Vandal population, from a high of between 30,000 and 40,000 men out of a total Vandal population of at most 200,000 people (Diehl and Bury), to as few as 25,000 men—or even 20,000, if their losses against the Mauri are taken into account—for a population base of 100,000 (Hughes). Despite their martial reputation, the Vandals had grown less warlike over time, having come to lead a luxurious life amidst the riches of Africa. In addition, their mode of fighting was ill-suited to confronting Belisarius' veterans: the Vandal army was composed exclusively of cavalry, lightly armored and armed only for hand-to-hand combat, to the point of neglecting entirely the use of bows or javelins, in stark contrast to Belisarius' heavily armored cataphracts and horse archers.

The Vandals were also weakened by the hostility of their Roman subjects, the continued existence among the Vandals of a faction loyal to Hilderic, and by the ambivalent position of the Mauri tribes, who watched the oncoming conflict from the sidelines, ready to join the victor and seize the spoils.

== War ==
=== Belisarius' army sails to Africa ===
Amidst much pomp and ceremony, with Justinian and the Patriarch of Constantinople in attendance, the Roman fleet set sail around 21 June 533. The initial progress was slow, as the fleet spent five days at Heraclea Perinthus waiting for horses and a further four days at Abydus due to lack of wind. The fleet left the Dardanelles on 1 July, and crossed the Aegean Sea to the port of Methone, where it was joined by the last contingents of troops. Belisarius took advantage of an enforced stay there due to a lull in the wind to train his troops and acquaint the disparate contingents with each other. It was at Methone, however, that 500 men died of dysentery caused by moldy bread. According to Procopius, the responsibility fell on John the Cappadocian, who had cut costs by baking it only once, with the result that the bread went bad. Justinian was informed, but John does not appear to have been punished. Belisarius took steps to remedy the situation, and the army soon recovered.

From Methone, the fleet sailed up the Ionian Sea to Zacynthus, from where they crossed over to Italy. The crossing took longer than expected due to lack of wind, and the army suffered from lack of fresh water when the supplies they had brought aboard went bad. Eventually, the fleet reached Catania in Sicily, from where Belisarius sent Procopius ahead to Syracuse to gather intelligence on the Vandals' activities. By chance, Procopius met a merchant friend of his there, whose servant had just arrived from Carthage. The latter informed Procopius that not only were the Vandals unaware of Belisarius' sailing, but that Gelimer, who had just dispatched Tzazon's expedition to Sardinia, was away from Carthage at the small inland town of Hermione. Procopius quickly informed Belisarius, who immediately ordered the army to re-embark and set sail for the African coast. After sailing by Malta, they reached Cape Caputvada on the eastern shore of modern Tunisia some 162 Roman miles (240 km) south from Carthage.

=== Advance on Carthage and the Battle of Ad Decimum ===
When the Roman fleet reached Africa, a council was held aboard Belisarius' flagship (The Vandalic War, I.15), where many of his officers advocated an immediate attack on Carthage itself, especially since it was the only fortified city in the Vandal realm, the walls of the other cities having been torn down to prevent a rebellion. Belisarius, however, mindful of the fate of the 468 expedition and wary of an encounter with the Vandal fleet, spoke against it. Thus the army disembarked and built a fortified camp to spend the night.

Belisarius knew that success for his expedition relied on gaining the support of the local population, which had largely retained its Roman identity and to which he presented himself as a liberator. Thus, on the next day of the landing, when some of his men stole some fruit from a local orchard, he severely punished them, assembled the army, and exhorted them to maintain discipline and restraint towards the native population, lest they abandon their Roman sympathies and go over to the Vandals. Belisarius' pleas bore results, for, as Procopius reports (The Vandalic War, I.17), "the soldiers behaved with moderation, and they neither began any unjust brawls nor did anything out of the way, and [Belisarius], by displaying great gentleness and kindness, won the Libyans to his side so completely that thereafter he made the journey as if in his own land".

Then the Roman army began its march north, following the coastal road. 300 horse under John the Armenian were detached as an advance guard some 3 miles (4.5 km) in front of the main army, while the 600 Huns covered the army's left flank. Belisarius himself, with his bucellarii, led up the rear to guard against any attack from Gelimer, who was known to be in the vicinity. The fleet followed the army, sailing along the coast. The first town they encountered was Syllectum, which was captured by a detachment under Boriades by a ruse. In an attempt to sow division among the Vandals, Belisarius gave a letter written by Justinian and addressed to the Vandal nobles to a captured Vandal messenger, in which the emperor claimed to be campaigning on behalf of the legitimate king Hilderic against the usurper Gelimer. As the messenger was too afraid to deliver the letter, this ploy came to nothing.

Gelimer's plan to encircle the Romans at Ad Decimum

Gelimer, in the meantime, upon learning of the Romans' arrival, immediately notified his brother Ammatas in Carthage to assemble the Vandal forces in the vicinity, as well as to execute Hilderic and his relatives, while his secretary Bonifatius was ordered to load the royal treasure on a ship and sail for Spain if the Romans won. Deprived of his best troops, which were with Tzazon, Gelimer contented himself with shadowing the northward march of the Roman army, all the while preparing a decisive engagement before Carthage, at a place called Ad Decimum ("at the tenth [milepost]") where he had ordered Ammatas to bring his forces. The Romans advanced through Thapsus, Leptis Parva and Hadrumetum to Grasse, where for the first time they engaged in a skirmish with the scouts of Gelimer's army. After exchanging blows, both parties retired to their camps. From Grasse, Belisarius turned his army westwards, cutting across the neck of the Cape Bon peninsula. This was the most dangerous part of the route to Carthage, with the fleet out of sight.

Thus, on the morning of 13 September, the tenth day of the march from Caputvada, the Roman army approached Ad Decimum. There Gelimer planned to ambush and encircle them, using a force under his brother Ammatas to block their advance and engage them, while 2,000 men under his nephew Gibamund would attack their left flank, and Gelimer himself with the main army would attack from the rear and completely annihilate the Roman army. In the event, the three forces failed to synchronize exactly: Ammatas arrived early and was killed by the Roman vanguard as he attempted a reconnaissance with a small force, while Gibamund's force was intercepted by the Hunnic flank guard and was utterly destroyed, with Gibamund being killed. Unaware of all this, Gelimer marched up with the main army and scattered the Roman advance forces present at Ad Decimum. Victory might have been his, but he then came upon his dead brother's body, and apparently forgot all about the battle. This gave Belisarius time to rally his troops, bring up his main cavalry force, and defeat the disorganized Vandals. Gelimer, with the remainder of his forces, fled westwards to Numidia. The Battle of Ad Decimum thus ended in a crushing Roman victory, and Carthage lay undefended before Belisarius.

=== Belisarius' entry into Carthage and Gelimer's counterattack ===
It was only by nightfall, when John the Armenian with his men and the 600 Huns rejoined his army, that Belisarius realized the extent of his victory. The cavalry spent the night at the battlefield. The next morning, as the infantry (and Antonina) caught up, the whole army made for Carthage, where it arrived as night was falling. The Carthaginians had thrown open the gates and illuminated the city in celebration, but Belisarius, fearing a possible ambush in the darkness and wishing to keep his soldiers under tight control, refrained from entering the city, and encamped before it. In the meantime, the fleet had rounded Cape Bon and, after learning of the Roman victory, had anchored at Stagnum, some 7.5 km from the city. Ignoring Belisarius' instructions, Calonymus and his men proceeded to plunder the merchant settlement of Mandriacum nearby.

On the morning of the next day, 15 September, Belisarius drew up the army for battle before the city walls, but as no enemy appeared, he led his army into the city, after again exhorting his troops to show discipline. The Roman army received a warm welcome from the populace, which was favorably impressed by its restraint. While Belisarius himself took possession of the royal palace, seated himself on the king's throne, and consumed the dinner which Gelimer had confidently ordered to be ready for his own victorious return, the fleet entered the Lake of Tunis and the army was billeted throughout the city. The remaining Vandals were rounded up and placed under guard to prevent them from causing trouble. Belisarius dispatched Solomon to Constantinople to bear the emperor news of the victory, but expecting an imminent re-appearance of Gelimer with his army, he lost no time in repairing the largely ruined walls of the city and rendering it capable of sustaining a siege.

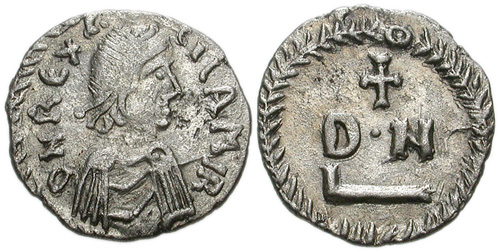
Fifty-denarii coin of Gelimer

During the following weeks, while Belisarius remained in Carthage strengthening its walls, Gelimer established himself and the remnant of his army at Bulla Regia. By distributing money, he had managed to cement the loyalty of the locals to his cause, and sent messages recalling Tzazon and his men from Sardinia, where they had been successful in re-establishing Vandal authority and killing Godas. While waiting for Tzazon's arrival, the Vandal king's army also increased by the arrival of more and more fugitives from the battle of Ad Decimum, as well as by a contingent of his Mauri allies. Most of the Mauri tribes of Numidia and Byzacena, however, sent embassies to Belisarius, pledging allegiance to the Empire. Some even offered hostages and asked for the insignia of office traditionally awarded to them by the emperor: a gilded silver staff and a silver crown, a white cloak, a white tunic, and a gilded boot. Belisarius had been furnished by Justinian with these items in anticipation of this demand, and duly dispatched them along with sums of money. Nevertheless, it was clear that, as long as the outcome of the war remained undecided, neither side could count on the firm loyalty of the Mauri. During this period, messengers from Tzazon, sent to announce his recovery of Sardinia, sailed into Carthage unaware that the city had fallen and were taken captive, followed shortly after by Gelimer's envoys to Theudis, who had reached Spain after the news of the Roman successes had arrived there and hence failed to secure an alliance. Belisarius was also reinforced by the Roman general Cyril with his contingent, who had sailed to Sardinia only to find it once again in possession of the Vandals.

As soon as Tzazon received his brother's message, he left Sardinia and landed in Africa, joining up with Gelimer at Bulla. The Vandal king now determined to advance on Carthage. His intentions were not clear; the traditional interpretation is that he hoped to reduce the city by blockading it, but Ian Hughes believes that, lacking the reserves for a protracted war of attrition, he hoped to force Belisarius into a "single, decisive confrontation". Approaching the city, the Vandal army cut the aqueduct supplying it with water, and attempted to prevent provisions from arriving in the city. Gelimer also dispatched agents to the city to undermine the loyalty of the inhabitants and the imperial army. Belisarius, who was alert to the possibility of treachery, set an example by impaling a citizen of Carthage who intended to join the Vandals. The greatest danger of defection came from the Huns, who were disgruntled because they had been ferried to Africa against their will and feared being left there as a garrison. Indeed, Vandal agents had already made contact with them, but Belisarius managed to maintain their allegiance—at least for the moment—by making a solemn promise that after the final victory they would be richly rewarded and allowed to return to their homes. Their loyalty, however, remained suspect, and, like the Mauri, the Huns probably waited to see who would emerge as the victor and rally to him.

=== Tricamarum and the surrender of Gelimer ===
After securing the loyalty of the populace and the army, and completing the repairs to the walls, Belisarius resolved to meet Gelimer in battle, and in mid-December marched out of Carthage in the direction of the fortified Vandal camp at Tricamarum, some 28 km from Carthage. As at Ad Decimum, the Roman cavalry proceeded in advance of the infantry, and the ensuing Battle of Tricamarum was a purely cavalry affair, with Belisarius' army considerably outnumbered. Both armies kept their most untrustworthy elements—the Mauri and Huns—in reserve. John the Armenian played the most important role on the Roman side, and Tzazon on the Vandal. John led repeated charges at the Vandal centre, culminating in the death of Tzazon. This was followed by a general Roman attack across the front and the collapse of the Vandal army, which retreated to its camp. Gelimer, seeing that all was lost, fled with a few attendants into the wilds of Numidia, whereupon the remaining Vandals gave up all thoughts of resistance and abandoned their camp to be plundered by the Romans. Like the previous battle at Ad Decimum, it is again notable that Belisarius failed to keep his forces together, and was forced to fight with a considerable numerical disadvantage. The dispersal of his army after the battle, looting heedlessly and leaving themselves vulnerable to a potential Vandal counter-attack, was also an indication of the poor discipline in the Roman army and the command difficulties Belisarius faced. As Bury comments, the expedition's fate might have been quite different "if Belisarius had been opposed to a commander of some ability and experience in warfare", and points out that Procopius himself "expresses amazement at the issue of the war, and does not hesitate to regard it not as a feat of superior strategy but as a paradox of fortune".

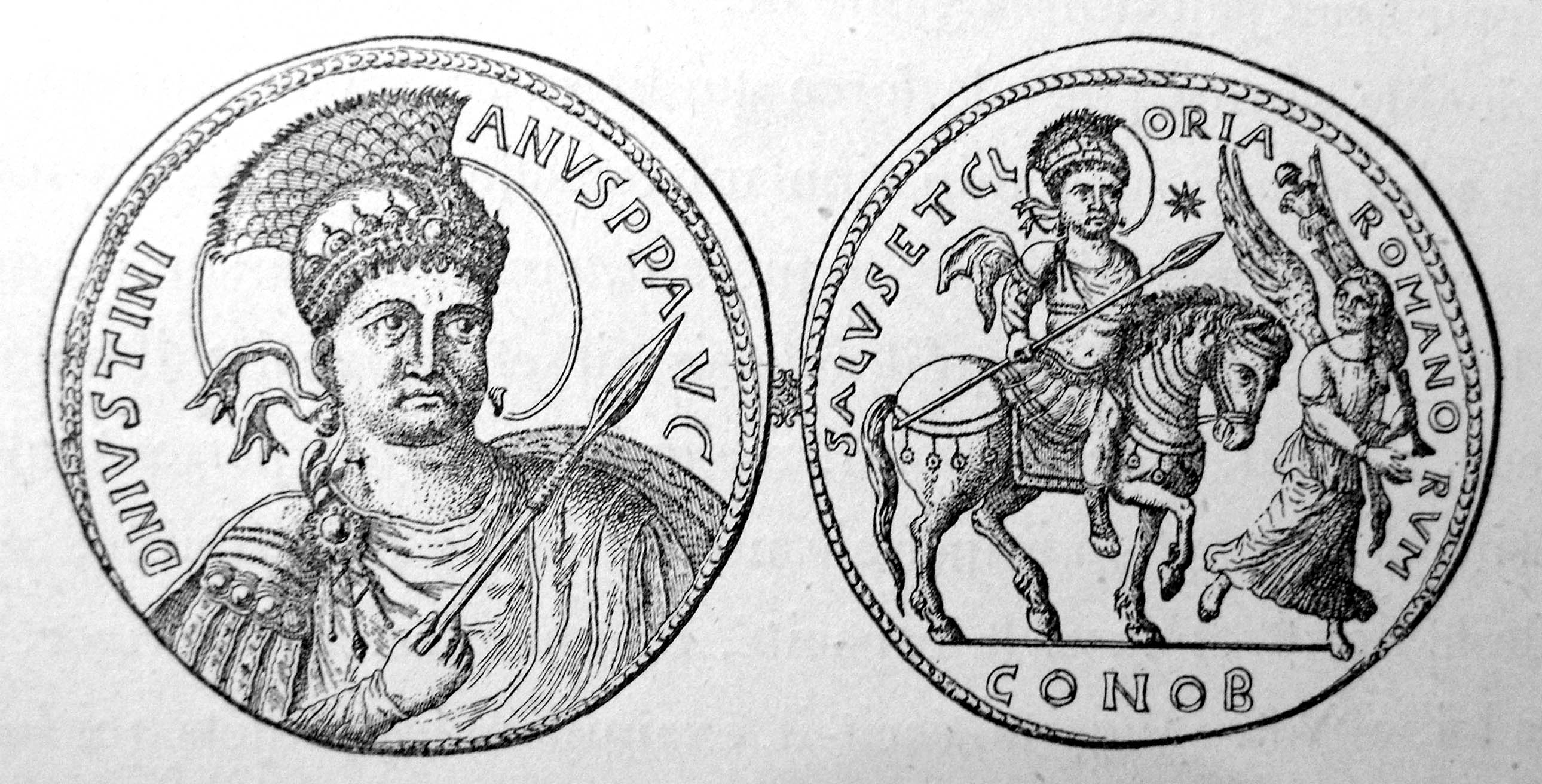
Drawing of a medallion commemorating the Roman victory in the Vandalic War, c. 535

A Roman detachment under John the Armenian pursued the fleeing Vandal king for five days and nights, and was almost upon him when he was killed in an accident. The Romans halted to mourn their leader, allowing Gelimer to escape, first to Hippo Regius and from there to the city of Medeus on Mount Papua, on whose Mauri inhabitants he could rely. Belisarius sent 400 men under the Herul Pharas to blockade him there. Belisarius himself made for Hippo Regius, where the Vandals, who had fled to various sanctuaries, surrendered to the Roman general, who promised that they would be well treated and sent to Constantinople in spring. Belisarius was also fortunate in recovering the Vandal royal treasure, which had been loaded on a ship at Hippo. Bonifatius, Gelimer's secretary, was supposed to sail with it to Spain, where Gelimer too would later follow, but adverse winds kept the ship in harbor and in the end, Bonifatius handed it over to the Romans in exchange for his own safety (as well as a considerable share of the treasure, if Procopius is to be believed). Belisarius also began to extend his authority over the more distant provinces and outposts of the Vandal kingdom: Cyril was dispatched to Sardinia and Corsica with Tzazon's head as proof of his victory, John was sent to Caesarea on the coast of Mauretania Caesariensis, another John was sent to the twin fortresses of Septem and Gadira, which controlled the Straits of Gibraltar, and Apollinarius to take possession of the Balearic Islands. Aid was also sent to the provincials in Tripolitania, who had been subject to attacks by the local Mauri tribes. Belisarius also demanded the return of the port of Lilybaeum in western Sicily from the Ostrogoths, who had captured it during the war, as it too had been part of the Vandal kingdom. An exchange of letters followed between Justinian and the Ostrogoth court, through which Justinian was drawn into the intrigues of the latter, leading to the Roman invasion of Italy a year later.

Meanwhile, Gelimer remained blockaded by Pharas at the mountain stronghold of Medeus, but, as the blockade dragged through the winter, Pharas grew impatient. He attacked the mountain stronghold, only to be beaten back with the loss of a quarter of his men. While a success for Gelimer, it did not alter his hopeless situation, as he and his followers remained tightly blockaded and began to suffer from lack of food. Pharas sent him messages calling upon him to surrender and spare his followers the misery, but it was not until March that the Vandal king agreed to surrender after receiving guarantees for his safety. Gelimer was then escorted to Carthage.

== Aftermath ==
=== Belisarius' triumph ===
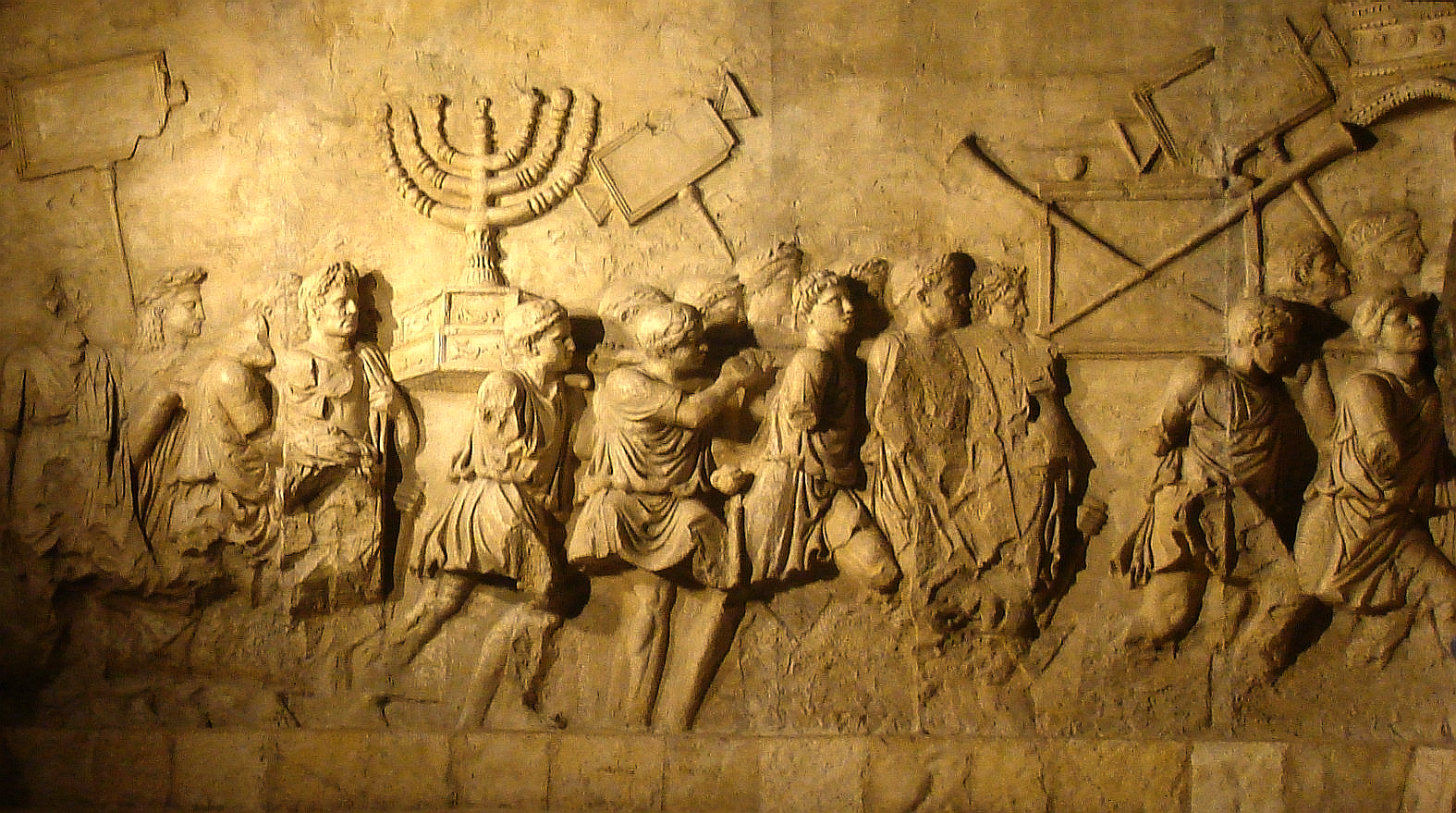
The Menorah of the Temple of Jerusalem, shown carried in the triumphal procession of Titus along with spoils from the Temple on the Arch of Titus in Rome

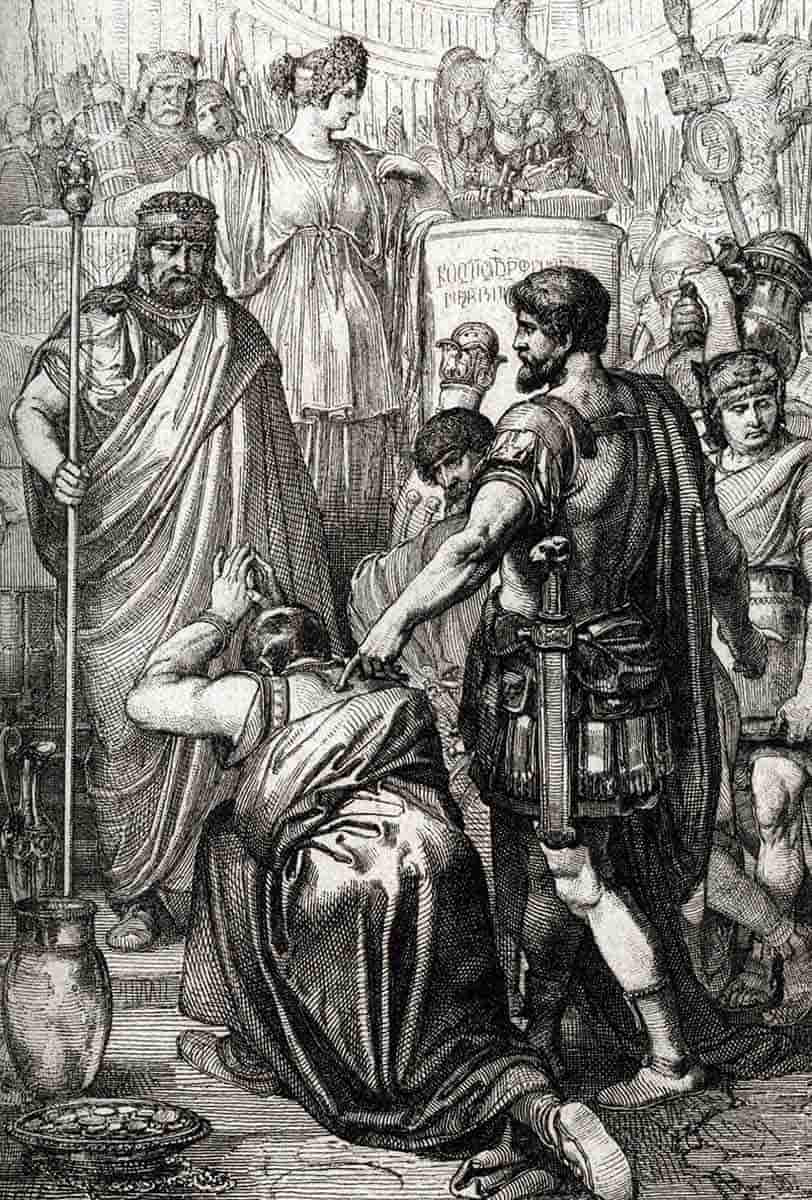
Belisarius presenting his Vandal captive, King Gelimer, to Emperor Justinian I (the wife of the emperor stands behind him), lithograph by Peter Johann Nepomuk Geiger (c. 1840)

Belisarius would not remain long in Africa to consolidate his success, as a number of officers in his army, in hopes of their own advancement, sent messengers to Justinian claiming that Belisarius intended to establish his own kingdom in Africa. Justinian then gave his general two choices as a test of his intentions: he could return to Constantinople or remain in Africa. Belisarius, who had captured one of the messengers and was aware of the slanders against him, chose to return. He left Africa in the summer, accompanied by Gelimer, large numbers of captured Vandals—who were enrolled in five regiments of the Vandali Iustiniani ("Vandals of Justinian") by the emperor—and the Vandal treasure, which included many objects looted from Rome 80 years earlier, including the imperial regalia and the menorah of the Second Temple. In Constantinople, Belisarius was given the honor of celebrating a triumph—the first to be celebrated in Constantinople since its foundation and the first granted to a private citizen in over five and a half centuries—and described by Procopius:

And there was booty—first of all, whatever articles are wont to be set apart for the royal service—thrones of gold and carriages in which it is customary for a king's consort to ride, and much jewelry made of precious stones, and golden drinking cups, and all the other things which are useful for the royal table. And there was also silver weighing many thousands of talents and all the royal treasure amounting to an exceedingly great sum, and among these were the treasures of the Jews, which Titus, the son of Vespasian, together with certain others, had brought to Rome after the capture of Jerusalem. [...] And there were slaves in the triumph, among whom was Gelimer himself, wearing some sort of a purple garment upon his shoulders, and all his family, and as many of the Vandals as were very tall and fair of body. And when Gelimer reached the hippodrome and saw the emperor sitting upon a lofty seat and the people standing on either side and realized as he looked about in what an evil plight he was, he neither wept nor cried out, but ceased not saying over in the words of the Hebrew scripture: "Vanity of vanities, all is vanity." And when he came before the emperor's seat, they stripped off the purple garment, and compelled him to fall prone on the ground and do obeisance to the Emperor Justinian. This also Belisarius did, as being a suppliant of the emperor along with him.

— Procopius, The Vandalic War, II.9

Gelimer was given an ample estate in Galatia, and would have been raised to patrician rank if he had not steadfastly refused to renounce his Arian faith. Belisarius was also named consul ordinarius for the year 535, allowing him to celebrate a second triumphal procession, being carried through the streets seated on his consular curule chair, held aloft by Vandal warriors, distributing largesse to the populace from his share of the war booty.

=== Re-establishment of Roman rule in Africa and the Mauri Wars ===
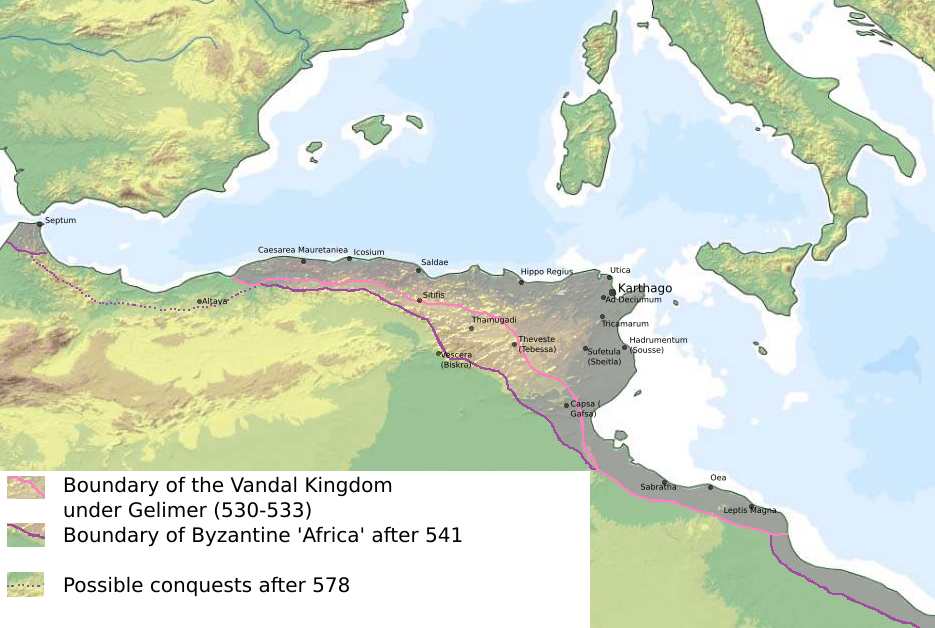
Partial Byzantine restoration of Roman North Africa, 541

Immediately after Tricamarum, Justinian hastened to proclaim the recovery of Africa:

Our predecessors did not deserve this favor of God, as they were not only not permitted to liberate Africa, but even saw Rome itself captured by the Vandals, and all the Imperial insignia taken from thence to Africa. Now, however, God, in his mercy, has not only delivered Africa and all her provinces into Our hands, but the Imperial insignia as well, which, having been removed at the capture of Rome, He has restored to us.

— Codex Justinianeus, I.XXVII

The emperor was determined to restore the province to its former extent and prosperity—indeed, in the words of J.B. Bury, he intended "to wipe out all traces of the Vandal conquest, as if it had never been, and to restore the conditions which had existed before the coming of Geiseric". To this end, the Vandals were barred from holding office or even property, which was returned to its former owners; most Vandal males became slaves, while the victorious Roman soldiers took their wives; and the Chalcedonian Church was restored to its former position while the Arian Church was dispossessed and persecuted. As a result of these measures, the Vandal population was diminished and emasculated. It gradually disappeared entirely, becoming absorbed into the broader provincial population. Already in April 534, before the surrender of Gelimer, the old Roman provincial division along with the full apparatus of Roman administration was restored, under a praetorian prefect rather than under a diocesan vicarius, since the original parent prefecture of Africa, Italy, was still under Ostrogothic rule. The army of Belisarius was left behind to form the garrison of the new prefecture, under the overall command of a magister militum and several regional duces. Almost from the start, an extensive fortification programme was also initiated, including the construction of city walls as well as smaller forts to protect the countryside, whose remnants are still among the most prominent archaeological remains in the region.

Despite Justinian's intentions and proclamations, however, Roman control over Africa was not yet secure. During his campaign, Belisarius had secured most of the provinces of Byzacena, Zeugitana and Tripolitania. Further west, on the other hand, imperial control extended in a series of strongholds captured by the fleet along the coast as far as Constantine, while most of the inland areas of Numidia and Mauretania remained under the control of the local Mauri tribes, as indeed had been the case under the Vandal kings. The Mauri initially acknowledged the Emperor's suzerainty and gave hostages to the imperial authorities, but they soon became restive and rose in revolt. The first imperial governor, Belisarius' former domesticus Solomon, who combined the offices of both magister militum and praetorian prefect, was able to score successes against them and strengthen Roman rule in Africa, but his work was interrupted by a widespread military mutiny in 536. The mutiny was eventually subdued by Germanus, a cousin of Justinian, and Solomon returned in 539. He fell, however, in the Battle of Cillium in 544 against the united Mauri tribes, and Roman Africa was again in jeopardy. After Solomon's death, unrest brewed in the region, fuelled by native resistance and military mutiny. Instability may have been furthered by the arrival of the plague in North Africa in 543, although its exact economic and demographic impacts remain unknown. General Areobindus was sent on a relief fleet in 545 but the clumsy power-sharing arrangement with commander Sergius worsened the situation. It would not be until 548 that the resistance of the Mauri tribes would be finally broken by the general John Troglita. Troglita is credited by Corippus and others for re-establishing Roman control in the region.

The degree to which Roman authority was fully re-established to its pre-Vandal conquest grandeur remains a subject of historical debate. Procopius, in his account of the Vandalic War, portrays the significant hardships experienced by the local population in the aftermath of the successful reconquest. The North African population after the war suffered from poor harvests during the late 530s and political instability and divisions within the elite and military groups.

Furthermore, Procopius implicitly questions the extent to which the restoration of Roman governance truly brought about prosperity and peace to the people of North Africa. In his later work, the Secret History, composed several years after the events of the Vandal War, Procopius provides a critical and unvarnished assessment of Emperor Justinian's administration of the newly acquired province. This controversial and rather scathing account of Justinian's reign reveals not only the military triumphs but also the complexities of governing the territory, including the contentious issues, corruption, and discontent that accompanied the post-war period. Further to this, the Secret History discusses the "ruined lives" of the North African population- a switch in perspective from his works in Vandal Wars which highlights the war as an epic triumph and victory for the Roman emperor. Ultimately, Kaldellis concludes that although Procopius leaves the reader with a 'gloomy impression' of North Africa, the verdict need not be accepted as certain elements of his book were entirely made up to serve his agenda.

There was evidence of prosperity in North Africa following the conquest too. Apart from fortifications, many buildings such as baths, public colonnades and monasteries were built. Carthage's ports were also redeveloped extensively, a fact confirmed by Procopius, and the lucrative tariffs previously levied by the Vandals on trading vessels would instead flow towards the Roman treasury. Furthermore, archaeological excavations at the port city of Leptiminus yielded evidence of major imperial investments in the industrial production of amphorae (used to export North African olive oil) and iron working. Historians have noted that North Africa was a wealthy province that had benefited the empire greatly.

== Sources ==
=== Primary ===
- Procopius of Caesarea. History of the Wars: The Vandalic War, Volumes I. & II. – via Wikisource.

=== Secondary ===
- Browning, Robert (1992). The Byzantine Empire (Revised ed.). Washington, DC: The Catholic University of America Press. ISBN 0-8132-0754-1.
- Bury, John Bagnell (1923). History of the Later Roman Empire: From the Death of Theodosius I to the Death of Justinian. London: MacMillan & Co. OCLC 537268.
- Diehl, Charles (1896). L'Afrique Byzantine. Histoire de la Domination Byzantine en Afrique (533–709) (in French). Paris, France: Ernest Leroux.
- Haldon, John (2001). The Byzantine Wars. Charleston, SC: Tempus. ISBN 0-7524-1795-9. OCLC 48001749.
- Heather, Peter J. (2018). Rome Resurgent: War and Empire in the Age of Justinian. New York, NY: Oxford University Press. ISBN 978-0-199-36274-5. OCLC 1007044617.
- Hughes, Ian (2009). Belisarius: The Last Roman General. Yardley, PA: Westholme Publishing, LLC. ISBN 978-1-59416-528-3.
- Kaldellis, Anthony (2016). "Prokopios' Vandal War: Thematic Trajectories and Hidden Transcripts". In S. T. Stevens and J. Conant (ed.). North Africa under Byzantium and Early Islam. Washington, D.C.: Dumbarton Oaks. pp. 13–21.
- Merrills, Andy; Miles, Richard (2010). The Vandals. Chichester, U.K.; Malden, MA: Wiley-Blackwell. ISBN 978-1-405-16068-1.
- Merrills, Andy (2022). "A Subaltern's View of Early Byzantine Africa? Reading Corippus as History". Medieval Worlds. 16. doi:10.1553/medievalworlds_no16_2022s44.
- Merrills, Andrew H.; Merrills, Andy (2023). War, Rebellion and Epic in Byzantine North Africa, A Historical Study of Corippus' Iohannis. Cambridge University Press. ISBN 9781009391986.
- Myers Achi, Andrea (2023). Africa and Byzantium. Metropolitan Museum of Art. ISBN 9781588397713.
- Sarris, Peter (2023). Justinian Emperor, Soldier, Saint. Basic Books. ISBN 9781541601345.
- Treadgold, Warren (1997). A History of the Byzantine State and Society. The Stanford Press. ISBN 978-0-80-472630-6.
- Whittow, Mark (1996). The Making of Byzantium, 600–1025. University of California Press. ISBN 0-520-20497-2.
