= Tripolitania expedition (523) =

- Part of various Berber-Vandal conflicts
Date	523
Location	Tripolitania
Result	Laguatan victory; Vandal rule collapsed in Tripolitania.

Belligerents
Vandal Kingdom	Laguatan Berbers

Commanders and leaders
Thrasamund	Cabaon

Strength
Unknown	Unknown

Casualties and losses
High; Many soldiers captured	Unknown

The Tripolitania expedition or the Oea expedition was a battle in 523 between various nomadic Berber ("Moor") confederations of Tripolitania, mainly the Laguatan led by Cabaon which previously seized lots of territory from, and raided several settlements of the Vandal Kingdom, and king Thrasamund of the Vandals who was attempting to restore Vandalic control over the territories lost to the advancing Berber tribes. The battle ended in a Laguatan victory and complete collapse of Vandalic control over much of Tripolitania.

== Background ==
Starting at the Vandal conquest of Roman Africa, the Vandals seized much of Northwest Africa still under Western Roman rule, and established the Vandal Kingdom in 435. They soon enough came into conflict with the native Berber population of the region, although initially under Gaiseric's rule Berber rebellions from inside, and nomadic Berber attacks from the deserts were mostly defeated and the Vandals held a solid grip over the region. However, this changed after Gaiseric's death in 477, and soon enough various Christian and Pagan Berber states and tribes began expanding at the expense of the Vandalic Kingdom. The Vandals first lost control over the west of their kingdom to the Kingdom of Altava, and then lost control over the Aurés to the locals in 484. Meanwhile in modern day Libya powerful nomadic Berber confederations such as the Laguatan began migrating mainly oasis to oasis from Cyrenaica to the region of Tripolitania and came into increased conflict with the local Vandalic garrisons. In the 510s the Laguatans and other Berber tribes allied to them seized much of the area of Tripolitania ranging from the Nafusa Mountains to the coast, and established a kingdom there. After this, the Tripolitanian Berbers began raiding the area of Byzacena, or the heartland of the Vandal Kingdom, which was already unstable after losing the regions of Dorsale and Capsa to other Berbers. In 523 then Vandalic king Thrasamund wanted to restore control over the territories lost in Byzacena, and to pacify Tripolitania, and decided to start his military campaigns by attacking the Laguatan then led by Cabaon.

== Procopius's description of the battle ==
There was a certain Cabaon ruling over the Moors of Tripolis, a man experienced in many wars and exceedingly shrewd. This Cabaon, upon learning that the Vandals were marching against him, did as follows. First of all he issued orders to his subjects to abstain from all injustice and from all foods tending towards luxury and most of all from association with women; and setting up two palisaded enclosures, he encamped himself with all the men in one, and in the other he shut the women, and he threatened that death would be the penalty if anyone should go to the women's palisade. And after this he sent spies to Carthage with the following instructions: whenever the Vandals in going forth on the expedition should offer insult to any temple which the Christians reverence, they were to look on and see what took place; and when the Vandals had passed the place, they were to do the opposite of everything which the Vandals had done to the sanctuary before their departure. And they say that he added this also, that he was ignorant of the God whom the Christians worshipped, but it was probable that if He was powerful, as He was said to be, He should wreak vengeance upon those who insulted Him and defend those who honoured Him. So the spies came to Carthage and waited quietly, observing the preparation of the Vandals; but when the army set out on the march to Tripolis, they followed, clothing themselves in humble garb. And the Vandals, upon making camp the first day, led their horses and their other animals into the temples of the Christians, and sparing no insult, they acted with all the unrestrained lawlessness natural to them, beating as many priests as they caught and lashing them with many blows over the back and commanding them to render such service to the Vandals as they were accustomed to assign to the most dishonoured of their domestics. And as soon as they had departed from there, the spies of Cabaon did as they had been directed to do; for they straightway cleansed the sanctuaries and took away with great care the filth and whatever other unholy thing lay in them, and they lighted all the lamps and bowed down before the priests with great reverence and saluted them with all friendliness; and after giving pieces of silver to the poor who sat about these sanctuaries, they then followed after the army of the Vandals. And from then on along the whole route the Vandals continued to commit the same offences and the spies to render the same service. And when they were coming near the Moors, the spies anticipated them and reported to Cabaon what had been done by the Vandals and by themselves to the temples of the Christians, and that the enemy were somewhere near by. And Cabaon, upon learning this, arranged for the encounter as follows. He marked off a circle in the plain where he was about to make his palisade, and placed his camels turned sideways in a circle as a protection for the camp, making his line fronting the enemy about twelve camels deep. Then he placed the children and the women and all those who were unfit for fighting together with their possessions in the middle, while he commanded the host of fighting men to stand between the feet of those animals, covering themselves with their shields. And since the phalanx of the Moors was of such a sort, the Vandals were at a loss how to handle the situation; for they were neither good with the javelin nor with the bow, nor did they know how to go into battle on foot, but they were all horsemen, and used spears and swords for the most part, so that they were unable to do the enemy any harm at a distance; and their horses, annoyed at the sight of the camels, refused absolutely to be driven against the enemy. And since the Moors, by hurling javelins in great numbers among them from their safe position, kept killing both their horses and men without difficulty, because they were a vast throng, they began to flee, and, when the Moors came out against them, the most of them were destroyed, while some fell into the hands of the enemy; and an exceedingly small number from this army returned home. Such was the fortune which Trasamundus suffered at the hands of the Moors.

— Procopius, History of the Wars, Book III

== Aftermath ==
The Vandals were severely weakened after the battle, and their control over Tripolitania was permanently weakened beyond relief until their collapse in 533 during the Vandalic War.
