= Flavius Felix (poet) =

Flavius Felix (fl. c. AD 480) was a Latin poet of the 5th century, known for five poems in praise of the thermal baths built by the Vandal king Thrasamund (r. 496–523).

== Bibliography ==
- Alexander Riese, ed. Anthologia Latina, vol. 1 (1869), nos. 210–14
- O. Skutsch, "Flavius 84", Real-Encyclopädie der klassischen Altertumswissenschaft, vol. 6/2 (1909), pp. 2597–8.
- Antony J. S. Spawforth, "Felix, Flavius", The Oxford Classical Dictionary, 4th ed. (2012), online
