= Vandal Kingdom =

Germanic-Iranic Kingdom in North Africa

Kingdom of the Vandals and Alans Regnum Vandalorum et Alanorum (Latin) Vandaliric (Vandalic)
- 435–534
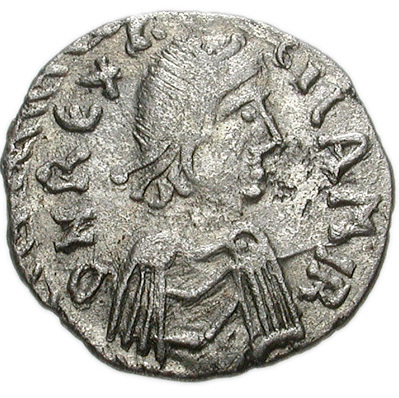
- Obverse of a "50 denarii" depicting Gelimer (ruled 530–534), the last ruler of the Vandal Kingdom

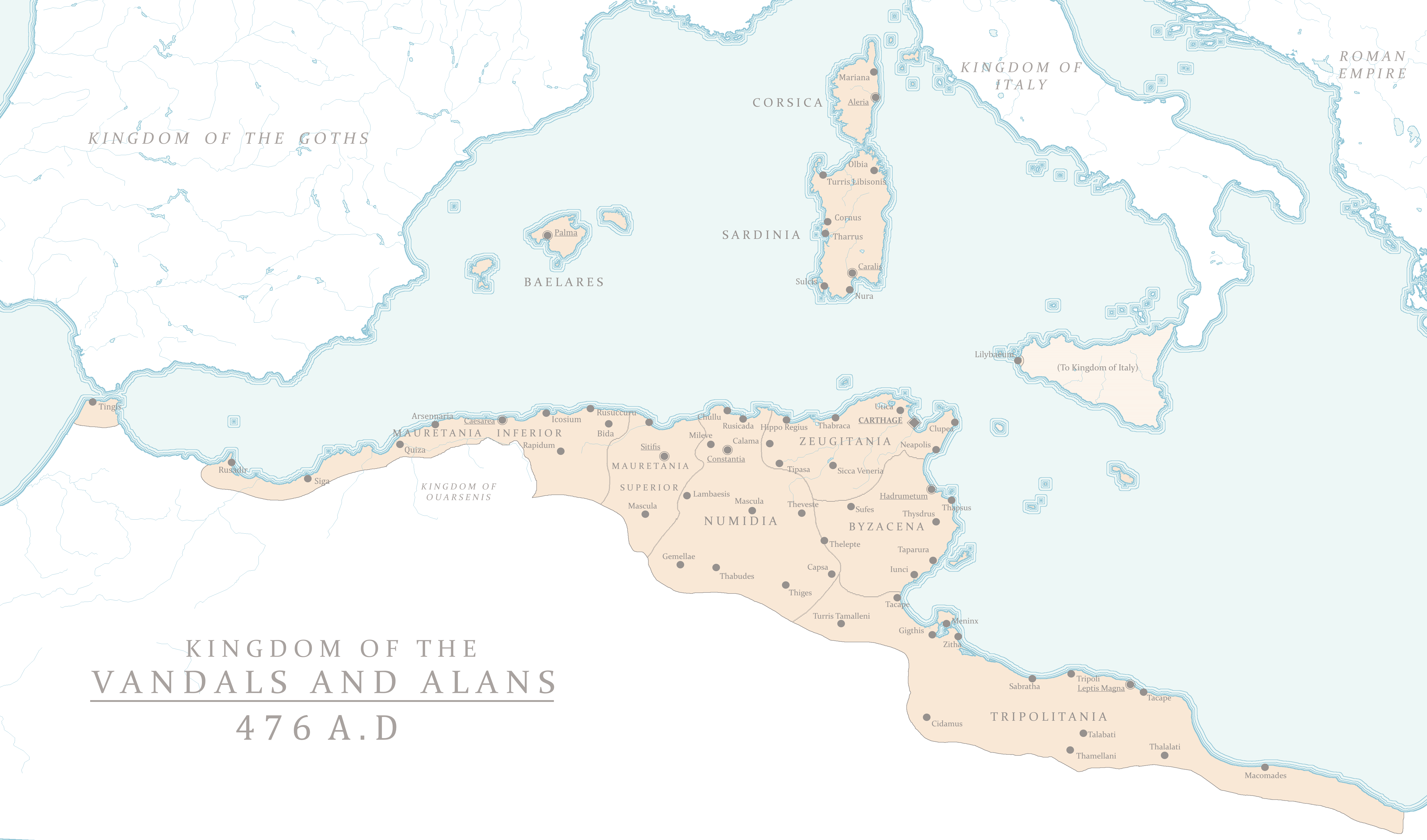
- The Kingdom of the Vandals and Alans in 476
- Capital: Hippo Regius (435–439); Carthage (439–534)
- Common languages: Latin (spoken by elite and clergy); Vulgar Latin and African Romance (spoken by common people); Vandalic (spoken among elite); Punic (spoken among common people); Alanic (spoken among Alanic elite); Numidian (spoken among common people in rural areas); Medieval Greek (spoken among common people)
- Religion: Arianism (among elite); Nicene Christianity then Chalcedonian Christianity
- Government: Pre-feudal Monarchy
- King
  - 435–477 AD: Gaiseric
  - 477–484 AD: Huneric
  - 484–496 AD: Gunthamund
  - 496–523 AD: Thrasamund
  - 523–530 AD: Hilderic
  - 530–534 AD: Gelimer
- Historical era: Late Antiquity
  - Vandalic conquest of Roman Africa: 435
  - Conquest by the Byzantine Empire: 534
Preceded by	Succeeded by
Africa (Roman province); Sicilia (Roman province)	Praetorian prefecture of Africa; Kingdom of the Aurès

The Vandal Kingdom (Latin: Regnum Vandalum) or Kingdom of the Vandals and Alans (Latin: Regnum Vandalorum et Alanorum) was a confederation of Vandals and Alans, and a barbarian kingdom established under Gaiseric (or Genseric), a Vandalic warlord. It ruled parts of North Africa and the Mediterranean for 99 years from 435 to 534 AD.

In 429 AD, an estimated 80,000 Vandals crossed from Hispania to North Africa. They advanced eastward, conquering the coastal regions of what is now Tunisia, and Algeria. In 435 AD, the Western Roman Empire, then ruling North Africa, allowed the Vandals to settle in the provinces of Numidia and Mauretania when it became clear that the Vandals could not be defeated militarily. In 439 AD, the Vandals renewed their advance eastward and captured Carthage, the most important city in North Africa. The fledgling kingdom then conquered the Roman-ruled islands of Mallorca, Sicily, Sardinia, and Corsica in the western Mediterranean. In the 460s AD, the Romans launched two expeditions by sea to overthrow the Vandals and reclaim North Africa; both were unsuccessful. The loss of North Africa was a blow to the beleaguered Western Roman Empire, as North Africa had been a major source of revenue, and a supplier of grain, especially wheat, to the city of Rome.

Although primarily remembered for their sack of Rome in 455 AD and the persecution of Nicene Christians in favour of Arian Christianity, the Vandals also supported the continued construction of educational institutions. According to historian Richard Miles, North Africa hosted "many of the most innovative writers and natural scientists" of the late Latin-speaking Western Roman Empire.

The Vandal Kingdom ended in 534 AD, when it was conquered by Belisarius in the Vandalic War and incorporated into the Eastern Roman Empire. The surviving Vandals either assimilated into the indigenous African population or were dispersed among the Byzantine territories.

== History ==
=== Establishment ===
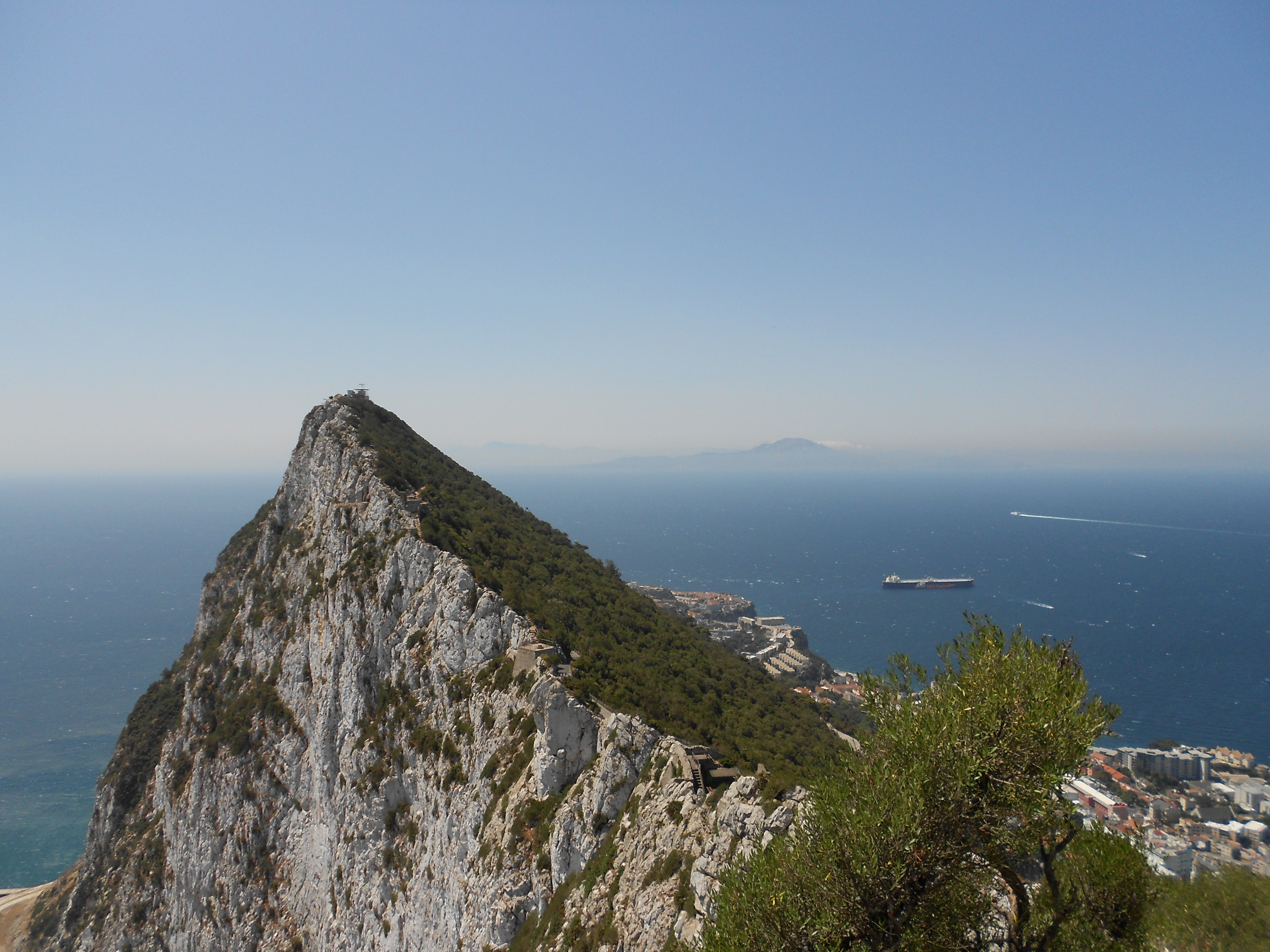
View from the Gibraltar strait to North Africa where the Vandals crossed into Africa.

The Vandals, under their new king Gaiseric (also known as Genseric or Geiseric), crossed to Africa in 429, beginning the Vandalic conquest of Roman Africa. Although their numbers are unknown and some historians debate the validity of estimates, based on Procopius's assertion that the Vandals and Alans numbered 80,000 when they moved to North Africa, Peter Heather estimates that they could have fielded an army of around 15,000–20,000. According to Procopius, the Vandals came to Africa at the request of Bonifacius, the military ruler of the region. However, it has been suggested that the Vandals migrated to Africa in search of safety; they had been attacked by a Roman army in 422 and had failed to seal a treaty with them. Advancing eastward along the African coast, the Vandals laid siege to the walled city of Hippo Regius in 430. Inside, Saint Augustine and his priests prayed for relief from the Arian Christian invaders, knowing that the fall of the city would spell conversion or death for many Nicene Christians. On 28 August 430, three months into the siege, the 75-year-old St. Augustine died — perhaps from starvation or stress, as the wheat fields outside the city lay dormant and unharvested. After 14 months, hunger and disease were ravaging both the city's inhabitants and the Vandals outside the walls. The city eventually fell to the Vandals, who made it their first capital. Peace was made between the Romans and the Vandals in 435 through a treaty between Valentinian III and Gaiseric, giving the Vandals control of coastal Numidia and parts of Mauretania. Gaiseric chose to break the treaty in 439 when he invaded the province of Africa Proconsularis and laid siege to Carthage. The city was captured without a fight; the Vandals entered it while most of the inhabitants were attending the races at the hippodrome. Gaiseric made it his capital and styled himself the King of the Vandals and Alans, to denote the inclusion of his Alan allies into his realm. Conquering Sicily, Sardinia, Corsica, Malta, and the Balearic Islands, he built his kingdom into a powerful state. Averil Cameron suggests that the new Vandal rule may not have been unwelcome to the population of North Africa, as the previous landowners were generally unpopular.

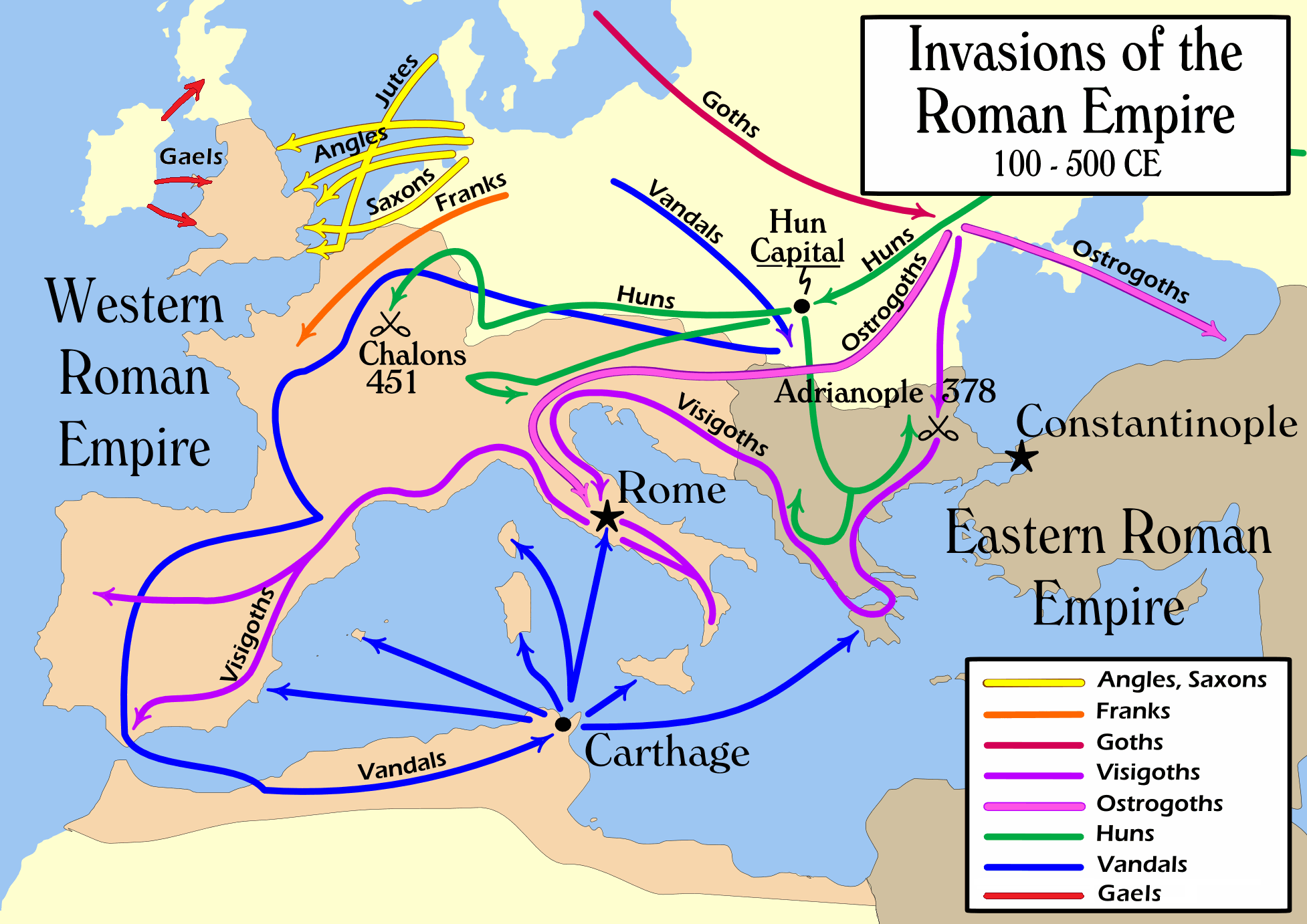
Routes taken by Vandal invaders during the Migration Period, 5th century AD

The impression given by sources such as Victor of Vita, Possidius, Quodvultdeus, and Fulgentius of Ruspe was that the Vandal takeover of Carthage and North Africa led to widespread destruction. However, recent archaeological investigations have challenged this assertion. Although Carthage's odeon was destroyed, the street grid remained the same, and some public buildings were renovated. The political centre of Carthage was Byrsa Hill. New industrial centres emerged in towns during this period. Historian Andy Merrills uses the large amounts of African red slip ware discovered across the Mediterranean that date from the Vandal period of North Africa to challenge the assumption that the Vandal rule of North Africa was a time of economic instability. When the Vandals raided Sicily in 440, the Western Roman Empire was too preoccupied with war in Gaul to react. Theodosius II, emperor of the Eastern Roman Empire, dispatched an expedition to deal with the Vandals in 441, but it progressed only as far as Sicily. The Western Empire, under Valentinian III, secured peace with the Vandals in 442. Under the treaty, the Vandals gained Byzacena, Tripolitania, and part of Numidia and confirmed their control of Proconsular Africa.

=== The grain trade ===
Historians since Edward Gibbon have seen the capture of North Africa by the Vandals and Alans as the "deathblow" and "the greatest single blow" to the Western Roman Empire in its struggle to survive. Prior to the Vandals, northern Africa was prosperous and peaceful, requiring only a small percentage of the Roman Empire's military forces, and was an important source of taxes for the empire and grain for the city of Rome. The scholar Josephus in the 1st century AD said that North Africa fed Rome for eight months of the year, with the other four months of needed grain coming from Egypt.

The Roman need for grain from North Africa may have declined by the 5th century because the population of the city of Rome had fallen, and the number of Roman soldiers had decreased. The treaty in 442 between Rome and the Vandals seems to have ensured that grain shipments continued. However, in terms of halting hostilities between Rome and the Vandals, that treaty was honored more in the breach than in the observance, and the Romans placed a high priority on recovering North Africa and regaining their control of grain from the Vandal Kingdom.

=== Sack of Rome ===
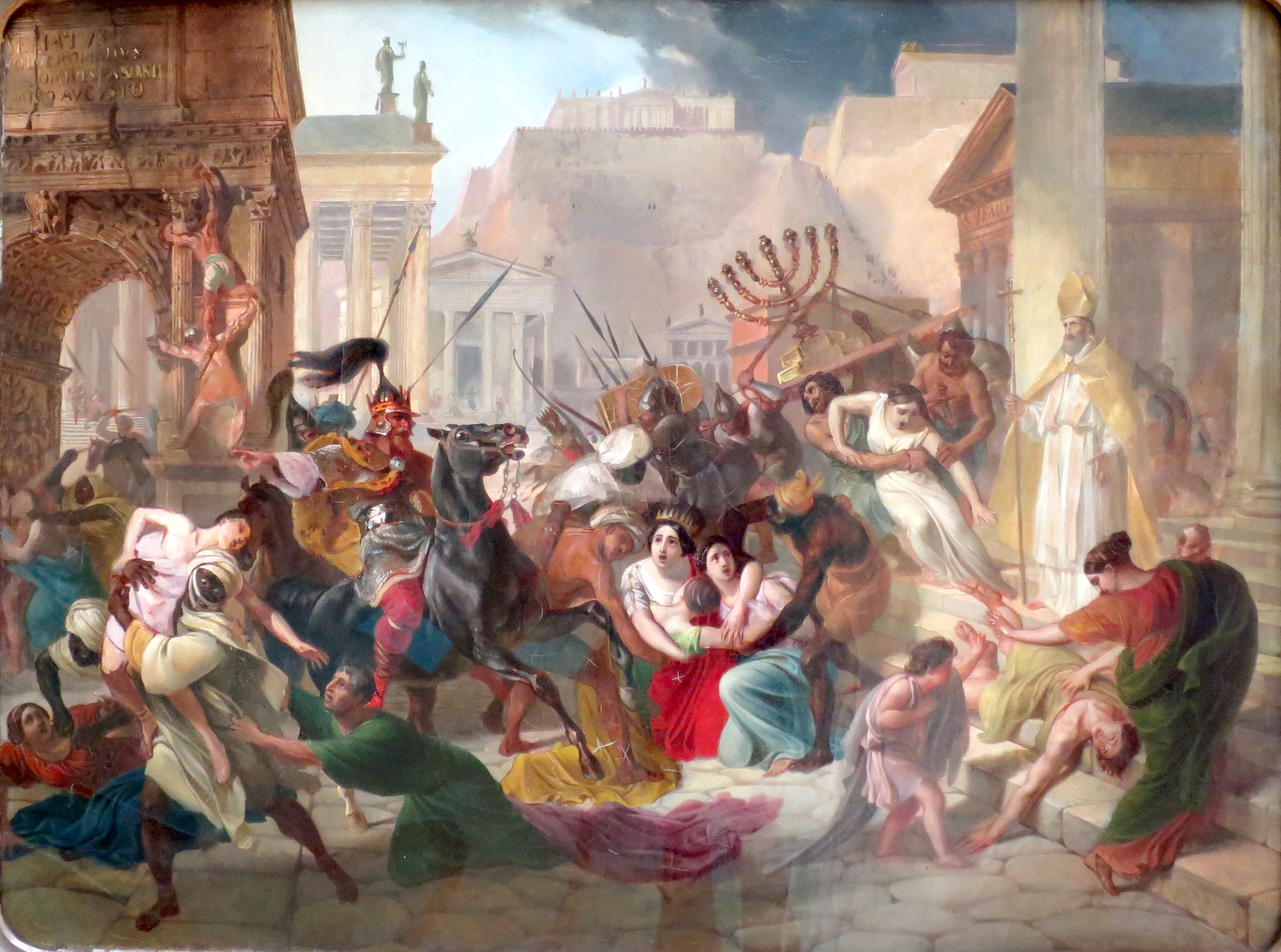
The Sack of Rome, painting by Karl Briullov from the 1830s.

The peace treaty of 442 did not halt Vandal raids in the western Mediterranean. Over the next 35 years, Gaiseric used his large naval fleet to loot the coasts of both the Eastern and Western Empires. After Attila the Hun's death in 453, however, the Romans turned their attention back to the Vandals, who were now in control of some of the richest lands formerly ruled by Rome.

In an effort to bring the Vandals into the fold of the Empire, Valentinian III offered the hand of his daughter, Eudocia, in marriage to Gaiseric's son Huneric when both Eudocia and Huneric were children. However, they had not yet wed when in 455, Valentinian III was murdered by accomplices of the usurper Petronius Maximus, who sought control of the Empire. Maximus immediately married Valentinian's widow, the Empress Licinia Eudoxia, and he also canceled Eudocia's betrothal to Huneric and married her instead to his own son, Palladius. Diplomacy between Rome and the Vandal Kingdom broke down. Eudoxia wrote a letter to Gaiseric, begging him to come to her aid. Claiming that the broken betrothal between Huneric and Eudocia invalidated his peace treaty with Valentinian, Gaiseric sacked Rome, rescuing Eudoxia, Eudocia, and Eudoxia's younger daughter Placidia (the latter was married to the future unrecognised emperor Olybrius). Maximus and Palladius were killed by an angry mob while fleeing the city.

The chronicler Prosper of Aquitaine offers the only 5th-century report that on 2 June 455, Pope Leo the Great received Gaiseric and implored him to abstain from murder and destruction by fire, and to be satisfied with pillage. The Vandals departed with countless valuables, including the spoils of the Temple in Jerusalem booty brought to Rome by Titus. Eudoxia and her daughters were taken to Carthage, where Eudocia married Huneric shortly thereafter.

The sack of Rome earned the Vandals association with senseless destruction through the noun vandalism.

=== Later years ===
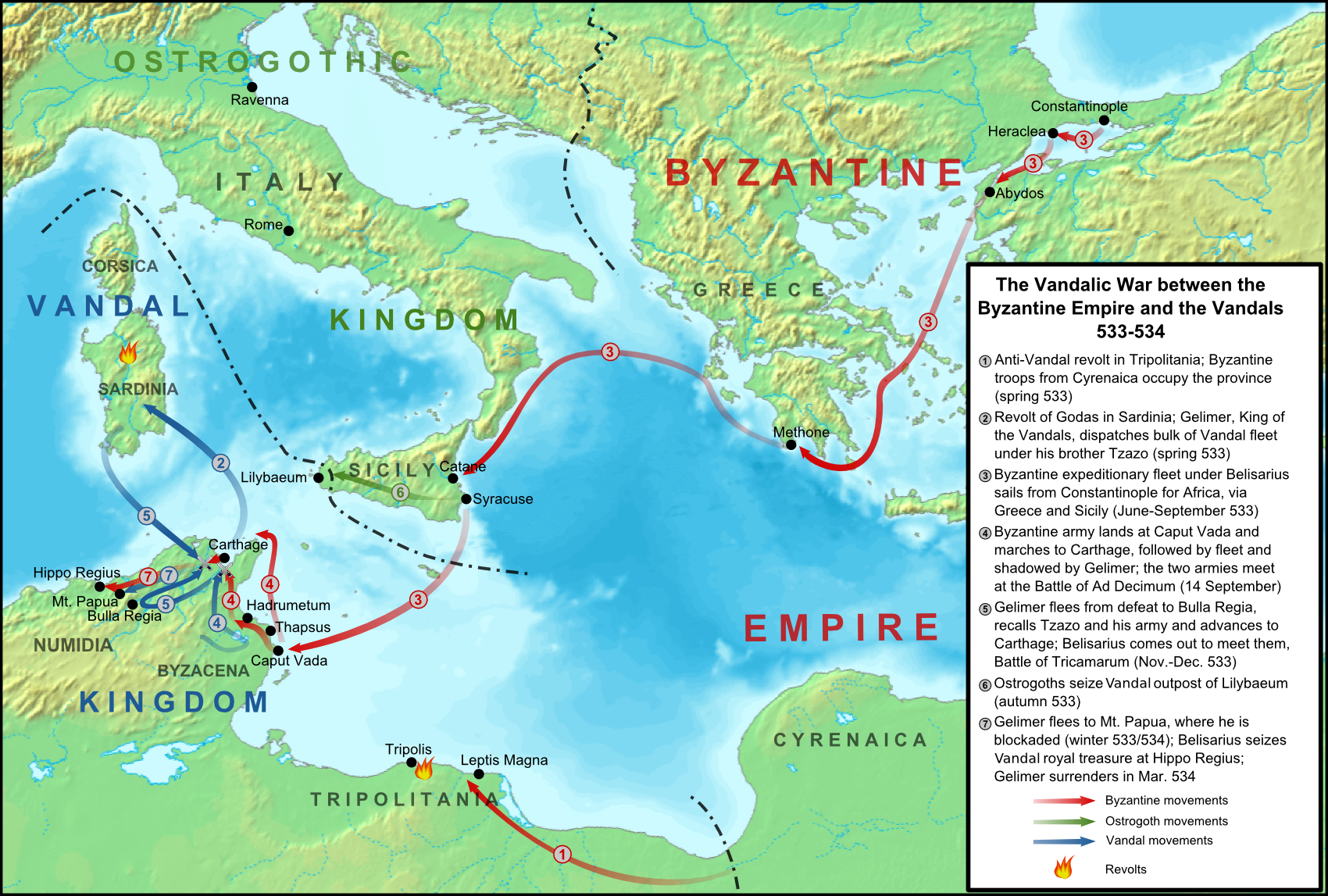
Map of the operations of the Vandalic War.

The Vandal sack of Rome, piracy in the Mediterranean, and the Roman need to recover control of the grain trade made the destruction of the Vandal Kingdom a priority for the Roman Empire. The Western Roman Emperor Majorian began to organize an offensive in the summer of 458. A maritime force staged from Cartagena in Hispania would take Mauretania and then march on Carthage, while a simultaneous assault, commanded by Marcellinus, would retake Sicily. The Emperor assembled his fleet in 460, but Gaiseric learned of the impending assault and "put a scorched earth policy into effect in Mauretania – scouring the land and poisoning the wells in advance of the planned imperial offensive." In addition, Gaiseric led his own fleet against Majorian's force and defeated the Romans at Cartagena.

In 468, both the Western and Eastern Empires attempted to conquer Africa again with the "most ambitious campaign ever launched against the Vandal state." Primary sources suggest that the fleet numbered 1,113 ships and carried 100,000 men, but this figure has been rejected by modern historiography, with Heather suggesting 30,000 troops and 50,000 soldiers and sailors combined, based on 16,000 Roman soldiers conveyed on 500 ships in 532. Andy Merrills and Richard Miles have asserted that the operation was undoubtedly extensive and "deserves admiration for its logistical brilliance." At a naval battle in Cape Bon, Tunisia, the Vandals destroyed the Western fleet and part of the Eastern fleet through the use of fire ships. Following up the attack, the Vandals tried to invade the Peloponnese but were driven back by the Maniots at Kenipolis with heavy losses. In retaliation, the Vandals took 500 hostages at Zakynthos, hacked them to pieces, and threw the pieces overboard on the way back to Carthage.

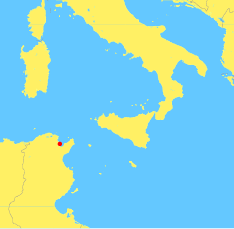
The location of Carthage, the Vandal capital.

In the 470s, the Romans abandoned their policy of war against the Vandals. The Western Germanic general Ricimer reached a treaty with the Vandals, and in 476 Gaiseric was able to conclude a "perpetual peace" with Constantinople. Relations between the two states assumed a veneer of normality. From 477 onward, the Vandals produced their own coinage, although it was restricted to bronze and silver low-denomination coins. Although the low-denomination imperial money was replaced, the high-denomination was not, demonstrating in the words of Merrills "reluctance to usurp the imperial prerogative".

Gaiseric died on 25 January 477, 88 years of age. According to the law of succession which he had promulgated, the oldest male member of the royal house was to succeed. Thus he was succeeded by his son Huneric (477–484), who at first tolerated Nicene Christians, owing to his fear of Constantinople, but after 482 began to persecute Manichaeans and Nicenes. He also murdered many rival members of the Vandalic dynasty. The native Berbers of North Africa who were kept in line during Gaiseric's rule soon began revolts and invasions against the Vandals following Gaiseric's death and Huneric's strict religious laws. The Vandals started rapidly losing territory in modern-day western Algeria to the Kingdom of Altava, and by the end of Huneric's rule he completely lost control over the Aurès Mountains to king Masties, who established the kingdom of the Aurès in 483–484.

Gunthamund (484–496), his cousin and successor, sought internal peace with the Nicenes and ceased persecution once more. Externally, Vandal power had been declining since Gaiseric's death; Gunthamund lost large parts of Sicily to Theodoric's Ostrogoths and had to withstand increasing pressure from the native Berbers, who raided everything inland up to the coast.

Gunthamund's successor Thrasamund (496–523) was a religious fanatic and hostile to Nicenes, but he contented himself with bloodless persecutions. In 510 the Frexenses Berber tribe under king Guenfan seized a portion of territory south of Thugga and established the Kingdom of the Dorsale, pushing the Vandals further out of inland. Around the 510s, migrating Laguatan berbers under king Cabaon captured Oea (modern Tripoli) and Sabratha and established a kingdom there, and began sacking Vandalic territories and destroyed various Vandalic settlements. Thrasamund attempted to crush him and retake his territory, but the expedition in 523 ended in a disastrous Vandalic defeat. He also allied with the Visigoths, but despite this alliance, Thrasamund failed to aid Theoderic when the Byzantine Navy ravaged the coast of southern Italy, preventing him from coming to the assistance of King Alaric of the Visigoths in the Battle of Vouillé, which contributed to Alaric's defeat.

=== Final years and conquest by the Eastern Roman Empire ===
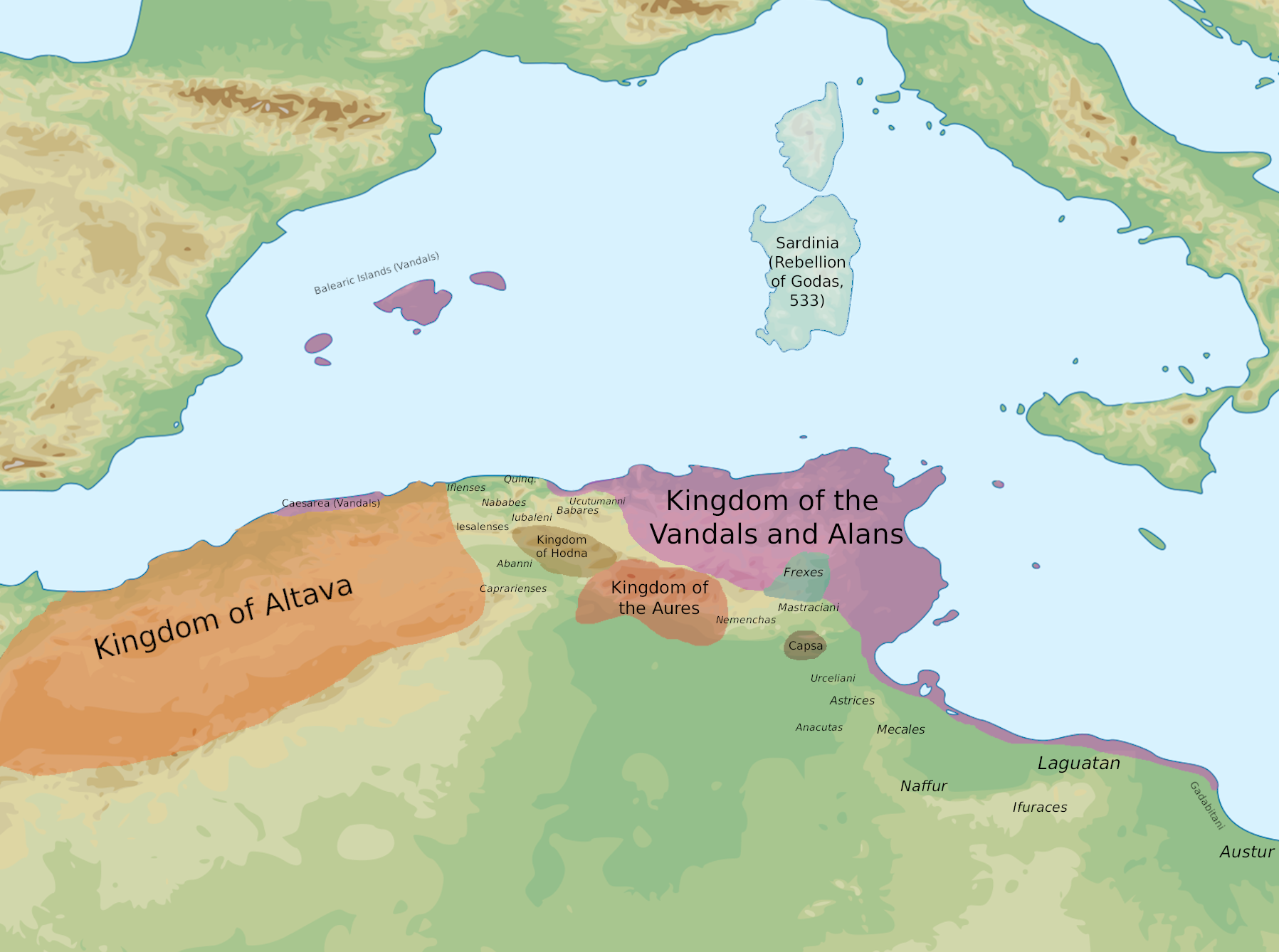
The Vandalic Kingdom and the Berber polities and tribes surrounding it in 533, before the Byzantine invasion.

Thrasamund's successor Hilderic (523–530) was the Vandal king who was most tolerant of Trinitarian Christians. He granted religious freedom, and consequently Chalcedonian synods were once more held in North Africa. However, he had little interest in war and left it to his nephew Hoamer. When the Vandals and the Berber Frexes tribe came into conflict yet again, Hoamer suffered a decisive defeat by the Frexes led by Guenfan and his son Antalas. Following this, the Arian faction within the royal family led a revolt, and Hoamer's cousin Gelimer (530–534) became king. Hilderic, Hoamer, and their relatives were thrown into prison. In 533, Hilderic was executed when the Byzantine army approached Carthage.

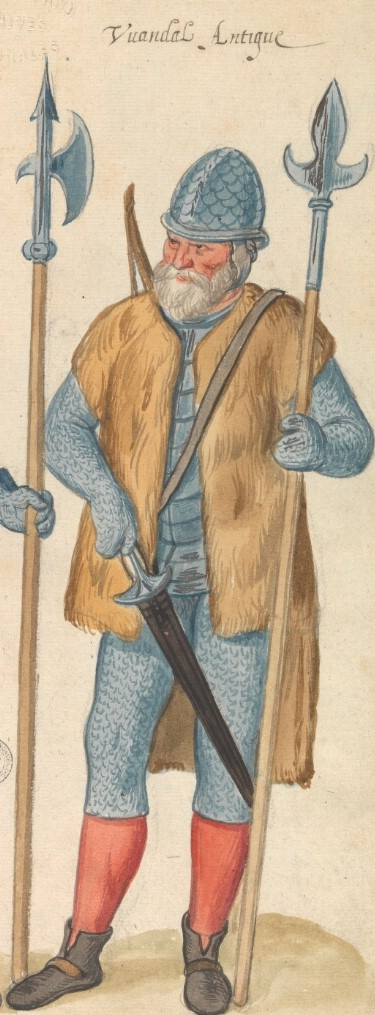
A 16th century perception of the Vandals, illustrated in a manuscript. Painted by Lucas d'Heere. Preserved in the Ghent University Library.

Byzantine Emperor Justinian I declared war, with the stated intention of restoring Hilderic to the Vandal throne. While an expedition was en route, Gelimer's brother Tzazo led a large part of the Vandal army and navy to Sardinia to deal with a rebellion by the Gothic nobleman Godas. This enabled the armies of the Byzantine Empire, commanded by Belisarius, to land unopposed 10 miles (16 km) from Carthage in the Summer of 533. Gelimer quickly assembled an army and met Belisarius at the Battle of Ad Decimum. The Vandals were prevailing until Gelimer's brother Ammatas and nephew Gibamund fell in battle. Gelimer then lost heart and fled. Belisarius quickly took Carthage as the surviving Vandals fought on.

On 15 December 533, Gelimer and Belisarius clashed again at the Battle of Tricamarum, some 20 miles (32 km) from Carthage. Again, the Vandals fought well but broke, this time when Tzazo fell in battle. Belisarius quickly advanced to Hippo, second city of the Vandal Kingdom. In 534 Gelimer, besieged at Mount Pappua by the Herulian General Pharas, surrendered to the Byzantines, ending the Kingdom of the Vandals and paving the way for Byzantine North Africa.

The Vandals' territory in North Africa (which is now northern Tunisia and eastern Algeria) became a Byzantine province. The best Vandal warriors were formed into five cavalry regiments, known as Vandali Iustiniani, and stationed on the Persian frontier. Some entered the private service of Belisarius. Gelimer himself was honourably treated and granted large estates in Galatia, where he lived to be an old man. He was also offered the rank of patrician but refused it because he was not willing to convert from Arianism to Nicene Christianity. In the words of historian Roger Collins: "The remaining Vandals were then shipped back to Constantinople to be absorbed into the imperial army," As a distinct ethnic unit they disappeared, either by fleeing to Spain or by being absorbed into the population of North Africa.

== Religious policies ==
From their invasion of North Africa in 429 onward, the Vandals, who were predominantly followers of Arianism, persecuted Nicene Christians. This persecution began with the unfettered violence inflicted against the church during Gaiseric's invasion, but, with the legitimization of the Vandal Kingdom, the oppression became entrenched in "more coherent religious policies." Victor of Vita's History of the Vandal Persecution details the "wicked ferocity" inflicted against church property and attacks against "many… distinguished bishops and noble priests" in the first years of the conquest; similarly, Bishop Honoratus writes that "before our eyes men are murdered, women raped and we ourselves collapse under torture." Citing these and other corroborating sources, Merrills has argued that there is "little doubt" that the initial invasion was "brutally violent." He has also argued along with Richard Miles that the Vandals initially targeted the Nicene Church for financial rather than religious reasons, seeking to rob it of its wealth.

Once Gaiseric secured his hold over Numidia and Mauretania in the treaty of 435, he worked "to destroy the power of the Nicene church in his new territories by seizing the basilicas of three of the most intransigent bishops and expelling them from their cities." Similar policies continued with the capture of Carthage in 439 as the Vandal king made efforts to simultaneously advance the Arian church and oppress Nicene practices. Heather notes that four major churches within the city walls were confiscated for the Arians, and a ban was imposed on all Nicene services in areas in which Vandals settled; Gaiseric also had Quodvultdeus, Bishop of Carthage, and many of his clergy exiled from Africa and refused "to allow replacements to be ordained… so that the total number of Nicene bishops within the Vandal kingdom suffered a decline." Laymen were excluded from office and frequently suffered confiscation of their property.

However, diplomatic considerations took precedence over religious policy. In 454, at the request of Valentinian III, Gaiseric installed Deogratius as the new Bishop of Carthage, a position that had been left empty since Quodvultdeus's departure. Heather argues that this accession was intended to improve Vandal–Roman relations as Gaiseric negotiated the marriage of his son Huneric to the Princess Eudocia. However, after Valentinian was killed and Vandal relations with Rome and Constantinople worsened, Gaiseric renewed his oppressive religious policies, leaving the bishopric empty once again when Deogratius died in 457.

Heather argues that Gaiseric's promotion of the Arian church, with the accompanying persecution of the Nicene church, had political motivations. He notes a "key distinction" between "the anti-Nicene character" of Gaiseric's actions in Proconsularis and the rest of his kingdom; persecution was most intense when it was in proximity to his Arian followers. Heather suggests that Arianism was a means for Gaiseric to keep his followers united and under control; wherever his people interacted with Nicenes, this strategy was threatened. However, Heather also notes that "personal belief must have also played a substantial role in Gaiseric's decision making."

Huneric, Gaiseric's son and successor, continued and intensified the repression of the Nicene church and attempted to make Arianism the primary religion in North Africa; indeed, much of Victor of Vita's narrative focuses on the atrocities and persecutions committed during Huneric's reign. Priests were forbidden to practice the liturgy, Homoousian books were destroyed, and almost 5,000 clergy were exiled into the desert. Violence continued with "men and women… subjected to a series of torments including scalping, forced labour and execution by sword and fire." In 483, Huneric issued a royal edict commanding all Chalcedonian bishops in Africa to attend a debate with Arian representatives. In the aftermath of this conference, he forbade Nicene clergy from assembling or carrying out baptisms or ordinations and ordered all Nicene churches to be closed and Nicene property confiscated. These churches were then turned over for the royal fisc or for Arian clerical use.

While primary sources reveal little about Gunthamund's religious policies, existing evidence does suggest that the new king was "generally better disposed towards the Chalcedonian faith than his predecessor [Huneric] had been" and maintained a period of tolerance. Gunthamund ended the desert exile of a bishop called Eugenius and also restored the Nicene shrine of Saint Agileus in Carthage.

Thrasamund ended his late brother's policies of tolerance when he ascended to the throne in 496. He reintroduced "harsh measures against the Catholic ecclesiastical hierarchy" but "worked to maintain positive relations with the Romano-African lay elite," his intention being to split the loyalties of the two groups.

Except for Hilderic, most Vandal kings persecuted Nicenes (as well as Donatists) to a greater or lesser extent, banning conversion for Vandals and exiling bishops.

== Administration ==
The administration of the Vandal Kingdom bears a close resemblance to the Roman provincial administration of Africa. While it was staffed by local Africans, the currency and taxation system were a creative adaptation of Roman models and were similar to those administered by the Romans. Vandal troops were also fashioned similarly to the Roman model. Power and wealth in the Vandal state were led by a military landowning aristocracy, and the political elite replaced and expropriated the largely absentee senatorial aristocracy. Other main sources of income included its takeover of the major grain and oil export region of the Romans, which had hitherto been the source of food for the major city of Rome. The wealth that the Vandal leaders accumulated was spent on luxurious town houses and religious buildings, according to literary sources and archeology.

== Royal women and dynastic politics ==
Women of the Hasding royal dynasty played a role in the dynastic and diplomatic relationships of the Vandal Kingdom, although they are often less visible in the surviving historical sources. Ancient authors did not consistently identify the wives, sisters and daughters of Vandal kings as Vandals, making it difficult to trace their positions and relationships within the dynasty. Their limited visibility in written accounts should therefore not necessarily be interpreted as evidence that royal woman were unimportant.

The Vandal system of kingship and succession also shaped the political position of royal women. Succession was organised around male members of the royal dynasty, limiting the formal political significance attributed to queens. Women could nevertheless contribute to dynastic relationships through marriage and family connections, even if they were not formally recognised as holders of political authority. This helps explains why their roles are less prominent in surviving accounts of Vandal political history.

Amalfrida, sister of the Ostrogothic King Theoderic the Great, provides an example of the diplomatic importance of royal women. Her marriage to Thrasamund, King of the Vandals, strengthened connections between the Vandal and Ostrogothic ruling families. Such marriages demonstrate how women could contribute to political alliances and dynastic relationships, even when their own political authority was limited.

== Population ==
Most people who lived in the Vandal Kingdom prior to the Vandal arrival mostly considered themselves Roman. The Vandals were a minority of the population.

== Economy ==
The state of the economy overall is hard to assess. The Vandals did not create any gold coins, but taxes were increased to primarily pay for expanding the army. Trade did continue with pottery being exported but at lower levels. Whether grain shipments to Rome continued is unknown. In the 5th century, there was a decline in trade across the Mediterranean as well.

When arriving in Africa, the Vandals confiscated land held by senators and gave the land to themselves. Those who had their land confiscated ended up keeping their rights. Those who lived in the territory prior and were wealthy kept their wealth and power.

== List of kings ==
Known kings of the Vandals:

- Wisimar (d. 335)
- Godigisel (359–406)
- Gunderic (407–428)
- Gaiseric (428–477)
- Huneric (477–484)
- Gunthamund (484–496)
- Thrasamund (496–523)
- Hilderic (523–530)
- Gelimer (530–534)

== Family tree of the kings of Vandals ==
Wisimar king of Hasdingi Vandals	Godigisel king of Vandals
Valentinian III; West Roman Emperor	Gunderic king of Vandals, Alans	Gaiseric king of Vandals, Alans
Eudocia of Valentinianic dynasty	Huneric king of Vandals, Alans	Gento prince
Hilderic king of Vandals, Alans	Gunthamund king of Vandals, Alans	Gelarius prince	Thrasamund king of Vandals, Alans	Amalafrida of Amal dynasty	Theodoric the Great king of Ostrogoths
Gelimer king of Vandals, Alans	Ammatus general

== See also ==
- Visigothic Kingdom
- Ostrogothic Kingdom
- Gepid Kingdom
- Lombard Kingdom
- Kingdom of the Burgundians
- Frankish Kingdom
- Suebic Kingdom of Galicia
- Vandal Sardinia
- Andalusia
- Church of the priest Félix and baptistry of Kélibia
- Baptistery of Bekalta

== Sources ==
- Bury, John Bagnell (1923). History of the Later Roman Empire, from the Death of Theodosius I to the Death of Justinian (AD 395 to AD 565). Macmillan. Archived from the original on 13 July 2021.
- Cameron, Averil; et al., eds. (2000). Late Antiquity: Empire and Successors, AD 425–600. Cambridge Ancient History. Vol. 14 (2nd ed.). Cambridge University Press. doi:10.1017/CHOL9780521325912. ISBN 978-1-139-05441-6.
  - Cameron, Averil. "Vandal and Byzantine Africa". In CAH^{2} 14 (2000), pp. 552–569.
  - Collins, Roger. "The western kingdoms". In CAH^{2} 14 (2000), pp. 112–134.
- Greenhalgh, P. A. L.; Eliopoulos, Edward (1985). Deep into Mani: Journey to the Southern Tip of Greece. Faber and Faber. ISBN 978-0-571-13523-3.
- Heather, Peter (2005). The Fall of the Roman Empire: A New History of Rome and the Barbarians. Oxford and New York: Oxford University Press. ISBN 978-0-19515-954-7.
- Heather, Peter (1 March 2007). "Christianity and the Vandals in the reign of Geiseric". Bulletin of the Institute of Classical Studies. 50 (Supplement_91): 137–146. doi:10.1111/j.2041-5370.2007.tb02384.x. ISSN 0076-0730.
- Maas, Michael, ed. (2015). The Cambridge companion to the age of Attila. Cambridge: Cambridge University Press. ISBN 978-1-139-12896-4.
- Merrills, Andy (2004). "Vandals, Romans and Berbers: Understanding Late Antique North Africa". Vandals, Romans and Berbers: New Perspectives on Late Antique North Africa. Ashgate. pp. 3–28. ISBN 0-7546-4145-7.
- Merrills, Andrew; Miles, Richard (2009). The Vandals. John Wiley & Sons. ISBN 978-1405160681.
- Victor of Vita (2011). Victor of Vita: History of the Vandal persecution. Translated by Moorhead, John. Liverpool: Liverpool University Press. ISBN 978-0-85323-127-1.
