= Hilderic =

King of the Vandals (ruled 523–530

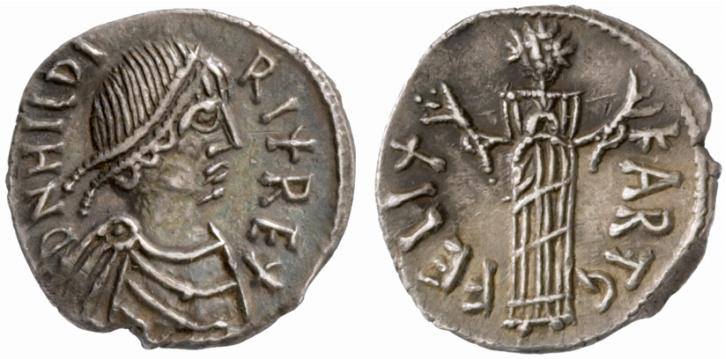
- A "50 denarii" struck in Hilderic's name (written as Hildirix), bearing his effigy and depicting the personification of Carthage

King of the Vandals and Alans
- Reign: 523–530
- Predecessor: Thrasamund
- Successor: Gelimer
- Born: c. 460
- Died: 533 (age 73)
- Father: Huneric
- Religion: Chalcedonian Christianity

Hilderic (Latin: Flavius Hildericus; original form possibly Hildirix (Note: The name is attested in this form on coins he minted.)) (c. 460–533) was the penultimate king of the Vandals and Alans in North Africa in Late Antiquity, ruling from 523–530. Although dead by the time the Vandal Kingdom was overthrown in 534, he nevertheless played a key role in that event.

== Early life ==
Hilderic was the grandson of king Gaiseric, founder of the Vandal kingdom in Africa. His father was Gaiseric's son Huneric, and his mother was Eudocia, the daughter of the Roman Emperor Valentinian III and Licinia Eudoxia. Most of the Vandals were Arians and had persecuted Chalcedonians, but Hilderic favored Chalcedonianism as the religion of his mother, making his accession to the throne controversial.

== Reign ==
Soon after becoming king, Hilderic had his predecessor's widow, Amalafrida, imprisoned; he escaped war with her brother, the Gothic king Theoderic the Great, only by virtue of the latter's death in 526.

Hilderic's reign was noteworthy for the kingdom's excellent relations with the Eastern Roman Empire. Procopius writes that he was "a very particular friend and guest-friend of Justinian, who had not yet come to the throne", noting that Hilderic and Justinian exchanged large presents of money to each other. Hilderic allowed a new Chalcedonian bishop to take office in the Vandal capital of Carthage, and many Vandals began to convert to Chalcedonianism, to the alarm of the Vandal nobility.

By the time he assumed the crown, Hilderic was at least into his fifties, if not more than 60. For this reason, according to Procopius, he was uninterested in the military operations of the Vandals and left them to other family members, of whom Procopius singles out for mention his nephew Hoamer.

After seven years on the throne, on the 15th of June, 530, Hilderic fell victim to a revolt led by his cousin Gelimer. Gelimer then became King of the Vandals and Alans, and restored Arianism as the official religion of the kingdom. He imprisoned Hilderic, along with Hoamer and his brother Euagees, but did not kill him. Justinian protested Gelimer's actions, demanding that Gelimer return the kingdom to Hilderic. Gelimer sent away the envoys who brought him this message, blinding Hoamer and putting both Hilderic and Euagees under closer confinement, claiming that they had planned a coup against him. When Justinian sent a second embassy protesting these developments, Gelimer replied, in effect, that Justinian had no authority to make these demands. Angered at this response, Justinian quickly concluded his ongoing war with the Sassanian Empire and prepared an expedition against the Vandals in 533. Once Gelimer learned of the arrival of the Roman army, he had Hilderic murdered, along with Euagees and other supporters of Hilderic he had imprisoned.

== Legacy ==
According to later legend, Hilderic had a daughter, Hildis, who through her legendary son Halfdan the Old was an ancestor of Ragnar Lodbrok and his descendants.

== Notes ==
Regnal titles
Preceded by Thrasamund	King of the Vandals; 523 – 15 June 530	Succeeded by Gelimer
