= Gento (son of Genseric) =

Gento was the fourth and youngest son of Genseric, the founder of the Vandal Kingdom in Africa, and father of the vandal kings Gunthamund and Thrasamund. According to Procopius, at the Battle of Cape Bon during the Vandal War (461–468) the Vandals seized a Roman ship. A Roman General named John leaped off the ship to his death despite Gento, “offering pledges and holding out promises of safety.” Gento died in battle in 477.

Gunthamund (c. 450–496), King of the Vandals and Alans (484–496) was the third king of the north African Kingdom of the Vandals. He succeeded his unpopular uncle Huneric, and for that reason alone, enjoyed a rather successful reign. Gunthamund was the second son born to Gento. Because most of Genseric's immediate family was dead, his elder brothers having been murdered by Huneric, Gunthamund found himself as the eldest male member of the family when Huneric died in 484. In accordance with his grandfather's laws on succession, which decreed that the oldest member of the family will be the successor, he was proclaimed king.

Thrasamund (450–523), King of the Vandals and Alans (496–523), was the fourth king of the north African Kingdom of the Vandals, and reigned longer than any other Vandal king in Africa other than his grandfather Genseric. Thrasamund was the third son of Gento, and became king in 496 after all of Genseric's sons and his own brother, King Gunthamund, had died.
