= Thrasamund =

King of the Vandals and Alans (ruled 496–523)

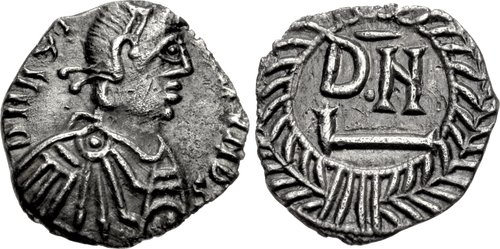
- Thrasamund's effigy on a silver "50 denarii"

King of the Vandals and Alans
- Reign: 496–523 AD
- Predecessor: Gunthamund
- Successor: Hilderic
- Born: c. 450 AD
- Died: 523 AD (age 73)
- Spouse: Amalafrida
- Father: Gento
- Religion: Arianism

Thrasamund (c. 450–523) was king of the Vandals and Alans from 496–523, (Note: Upon ascending to the throne, Thrasamund was given the titulature bearing the enthnonym Rex Vandalorum, which suggests that the Alans may not have remained a distinct political entity after the first generation of their peoples occupying North Africa had passed.) and the fourth king of the North African Vandal Kingdom. He was the son of Gento and the grandson of the Vandal Kingdom's founder, Gaiseric. Thrasamund ruled longer than any other Vandal king in Africa aside from his grandfather. He was known for his commitment to Arianism and for his antagonism towards Nicene Christians. Upon his death in 523, Thrasamund was succeeded by his cousin, Hilderic.

== Early life ==
Thrasamund was born to Gaiseric's son, Gento, and became king in 496 after his brother, King Gunthamund died. Upon Gunthamund's death, Thrasamund was one of only two living grandsons of Gaiseric and inherited the throne in accordance with a law enacted by his grandfather, which bestowed the kingship on the eldest male member of a deceased king's family.

The Byzantine historian Procopius described Thrasamund as "especially good-looking" and quipped that the Vandal king was "gifted with discretion and high-mindedness."

== Reign ==
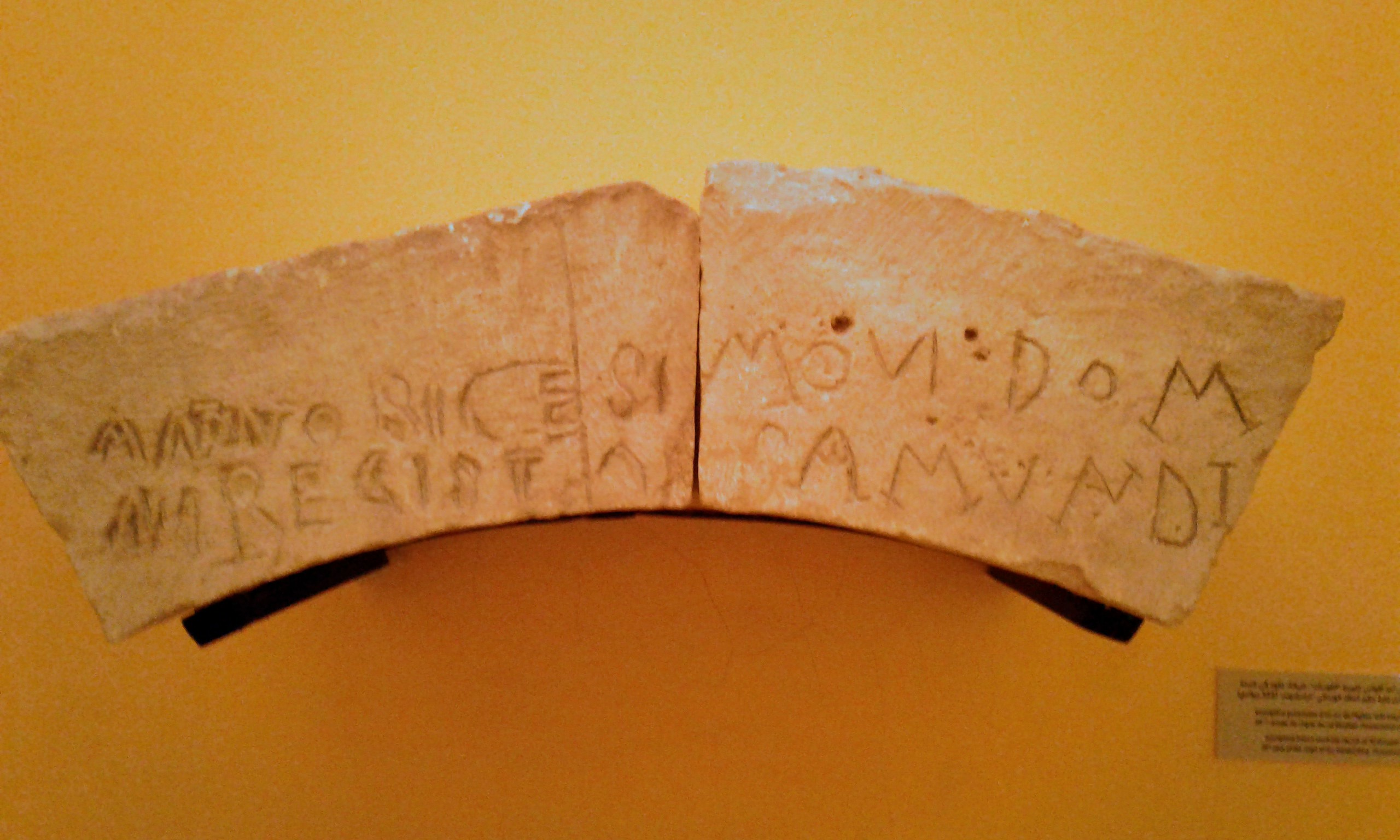
Writing on a church vault in Henchir-el-Gousset, Feriana region, Tunisia, dated to the 26th year of Thrasamund's reign (522 AD), inscribed: ANNO BICESIMO [sic] VI DOM[I]NI REGIS TASAMVNDI; Archeological museum of Sbeitla

During Thrasamnund's monarchy, the Vandals in North Africa enjoyed lengthy periods of relative peace, the economy was flourishing, and cultural life was thriving. The Vandal king Thrasamund has been depicted as a "scholar king" in a number of poems from the sixth-century. More specifically, one poem by Florentinus praised Thrasamund's reverence, foresight, bravery, vigorous education, and intelligence, while claiming that with him as king, "the citadel of Carthage shines forth steadily". Florentinus essentially casts Thrasamund in the very "mold of a Roman emperor" and depicts him as having created a favorable cultural environment for scholarly debate, including over matters of theology.

If Procopius can be believed, Thrasamund did not take a hard line against Catholics like his immediate Vandal predecessors had, but instead sought more earnestly to coerce them at first. To ensure his authority, Thrasamund required annual oaths of loyalty from his subordinates, indicated by panegyrics from contemporaneous figures. To his credit perhaps, his ascension was marked by substantial changes in the Vandal regnum's diplomatic situation.

=== Ties to Theodoric the Great ===
Perhaps to strengthen the bonds among the barbarian kingdoms, Theodoric the Great married his widowed sister Amalafrida to Thrasamund, providing a dowry consisting of the promontory of Lilybaeum in Sicily, and a retinue of a thousand elite troops and five thousand armed retainers. (Note: For the primary source on this matter, see Procopius, 3.8.11–13.) It is conceivable that such a sizable contingent of Goths surrounding Amalafrida was Theodoric's way of ensuring he could intervene in Vandal affairs if necessary and could have potentially made Thrasamund a "subordinate" to the Ostrogothic king. Historian Hans-Ulrich Wiemer points out that Thrasamund's force strength was only about twice what Theodeoric sent with Amalafridfa. A panegyric from 507 celebrated Vandal "obedience" to Theodoric's rule and the Roman statesman Cassiodorus—serving in Theodoric's employ—implied that one of Italy's great enemies had been "brought to heel by Gothic diplomacy". Austrian historian Herwig Wolfram places the date of the marriage between Amalafrida and Thrasamund at around 500. This union secured a strong bond between the kingdoms in North Africa and Italy. The arrangements between the three barbarian kingdoms of Vandals, Ostrogoths, and Visigoths—each of which occupied adjacent realms around the Mediterranean—were strengthened by their shared Arianism and could have been "anti-Byzantine in purpose".

Instead of receiving tribute payments, Thrasamund had to be content thereafter with friendly relations between his Vandals and Theodoric's Ostrogoths. Despite this alliance, Thrasamund was unable to aid the Ostrogothic king Theodoric when the Byzantine Navy ravaged the coast of southern Italy, which also prevented him from coming to the assistance of King Alaric II of the Visigoths during the Battle of Vouillé, contributing to a Visigothic defeat. It seems Thrasamund was wary of sending his fleet against the Byzantine emperor, since he appeared to have valued his relationship with emperor Anastasius over any alliance obligations he otherwise had to Theodoric. It would not be the last time that Thrasamund disappointed the Ostrogothic king. Nonetheless, Thrasamund remained "closely allied" to Byzantium.

Sometime in 510, Gesalec—the illegitimate son of the Visigoth king Alaric II—who became king himself and was once recognized by Theodoric, fell from the Ostrogothic monarch's favor and was driven from the throne after losing a key strategic node—the former Visigothic capital at Narbonne; after which, he fled to Thrasamund in Carthage. Thrasamund generously gave Gesalec money, who then returned to his kingdom and formed an army at Aquitaine to fight the Ostrogothic general Ibbas. Defeated by Ibbas, Geselec tried to flee to the Burgundians but was captured and put to death before reaching them. Feeling again betrayed by Thrasamund for harboring and aiding an identified rival of the Ostrogothic Kingdom, Theodoric expressed his displeasure in a letter to his brother-in-law:

Although, to reinforce concord [concordia] with sundry kings, We joined to them, at their request, either nieces or daughters as God inspired Us, still We think We conferred on no one anything comparable to making Our sister, the singular glory of the Amal line, your spouse: a woman your equal in wisdom [prudentia], a woman who can be admired for her council even more than she should be revered by your kingdom.

But I am stunned that, despite the fact that you were obligated by these favors, Gesalec, who joined our enemies while favored by Ourselves, was received into your protection in such a way that, although he came to you abandoned by his forces and bereft of means, yet he was outfitted with a sudden abundance of money and sent over [the Mediterranean] to foreign peoples [gentes exteras]; and though he proved utterly harmless, thanks be to God, he still unveiled the nature of your mind.

What can the rights of foreigners expect, if kinship by marriage [affinitas] deserves such treatment? If he was received in your kingdom out of pity, he should have been held there; if he was expelled for Our sake, then he should not have been sent with riches over to the kingdoms of others, which Our struggles absolutely prevented from becoming hostile to yourself. (Note: The original text comes from Cassiodorus's Variae epistolae, 5.43.1–3. Another translation therein can be found at the following webpage: https://www.gutenberg.org/files/18590/18590-h/18590-h.htm#Page_292)

Now the undisputed master of the Iberian Peninsula, Theodoric communicated from a place of power, which Thrasamund recognized, remorsefully appealing to Theodoric for forgiveness—a plea accompanied with precious gifts of gold.

Not only did Theodoric forgive Thrasamund, admonishing him accordingly, but he also returned the gold. Historian Peter Heather explains that Theodoric's rejection of a gift and its return was a "calculated insult" and a warning to Thrasamund that "the Vandal kingdom was still on probation". Thrasamund subsequently never again "dared to provoke" the Ostrogothic king.

=== Moors on the periphery ===
At the time of his wedding, Thrasamund and his Vandals were already at war with several Moorish kingdoms. Throughout the course of his rule, Thrasamund faced the ongoing threat posed by the Moors along the periphery of his territories, who became increasingly destructive and formidable across north Africa. (Note: According to historian Justine Davis Randers-Pehrson, more so than the Vandals, the Moors were the greater threat to Byzantium in North Africa.)

In the final year of Thrasamund's reign, the important port city of Leptis Magna was sacked by a mixed army of Moors and Berbers. Procopius describes a battle between the Berbers of Tripoli under Cabaon and the Vandals, in which the Berbers used unusual tactics to defeat the Vandal cavalry. Historian Guy Halsall described the event as a "severe defeat" for the Vandals at Moorish hands in much the way it was for the next Vandal king, which eventually brought intervention to North Africa from Emperor Justinian.

=== Persecution of Catholics ===
According to Gregory of Tours, Thrasamund engaged in persecution of Catholics in Spain in order to force them to embrace Arian Christianity. Gregory wrote of a story where a noblewoman was forcibly re-baptized against her will during which, she began to bleed into the water from menstruation while they carried it out. They subsequently killed her by beheading. However, Gregory's jaded version of Thrasamund's stance towards Catholics is not especially reliable according to scholars John Moorhead and Andrew Cain, who avow his chronology was confused and that Gregory was instead describing events that occurred under Gunderic's reign.

Still, Thrasamund was strongly disposed to his Arianism and to traditional Roman culture, and he tried to persuade Catholics across his kingdom to turn away from the faith's doctrine and went so far as to even bribe Catholic officials. In 515, he also participated in a written theological dispute (favoring Arianism as he did) with the leading figure of the Catholics, Fulgentius of Ruspe, whom he invited—along with Arian bishops—to Carthage. Yet none of this intellectual exchange prevented him for persecuting members of the Catholic clergy; for instance, he banished Bishop Eugenius of Carthage and Fulgentius several times, including sending them to Sardinia. Other African clerics were likewise sent into exile at Sardinia by Thrasamund during his reign. (Note: The figure of exiled bishops reached "60 or more" in 508/509 alone.)

Eventually, Thrasamund ended many years of pressure upon the Catholic Church, which had begun under his uncle Huneric, a move which improved the Vandals' relations with the Byzantine Empire. Procopius states that Thrasamund became "a very special friend of the Emperor Anastasius."

== Death ==
Sometime during 523, Thrasamund died in North Africa and was succeeded by his cousin Hilderic. Shortly in the wake of Thrasamund's death, Hilderic reversed Thrasamund's strict policies towards Nicene Christians and "allowed Catholics to worship freely." Thrasamund's widow Amalafrida then fled to the Moors on the edge of the Byzacena desert, before being captured by Hilderic's agents and placed in prison, where she died.

== Bibliography ==
- Cain, Andrew (2005). "Miracles, Martyrs, and Arians: Gregory of Tours' Sources for His Account of the Vandal Kingdom". Vigiliae Christianae. 59 (4): 412–437.
- Conant, Jonathon (2012). Staying Roman: Conquest and Identity in Africa and the Mediterranean, 439–700. Cambridge and New York: Cambridge University Press. ISBN 978-0-52119-697-0.
- Gregory of Tours (1974). The History of the Franks. Translated by Lewis Thorpe. New York: Penguin Books. ISBN 978-0-14044-295-3.
- Halsall, Guy (2007). Barbarian Migrations and the Roman West, 376–568. Cambridge and New York: Cambridge University Press. ISBN 978-0-52143-543-7.
- Heather, Peter (2013). The Restoration of Rome: Barbarian Popes and Imperial Pretenders. Oxford and New York: Oxford University Press. ISBN 978-0-19936-851-8.
- Hen, Yitzhak (2007). Roman Barbarians: The Royal Court and Culture in the Early Medieval West. New York: Palgrave Macmillan. ISBN 978-0-33378-665-9.
- James, Edward (2014). Europe's Barbarians, AD 200–600. London and New York: Routledge. ISBN 978-0-58277-296-0.
- Kaldellis, Anthony (2024). The New Roman Empire: A History of Byzantium. Oxford and New York: Oxford University Press. ISBN 978-0-19754-932-2.
- Merrills, Andy; Miles, Richard (2010). The Vandals. Malden, MA: Wiley-Blackwell. ISBN 978-1-44431-807-4.
- Moorhead, John (2005). "The Byzantines in the West in the Sixth Century". In Paul Fouracre (ed.). The New Cambridge Medieval History. Vol. I [c.500–c.700]. Cambridge; New York: Cambridge University Press. pp. 118–139. ISBN 978-0-52136-291-7.
- Prokopios (2014). The Wars of Justinian. Translated by H. B. Dewing. New York: Indianapolis; Cambridge. ISBN 978-1-62466-172-3.
- Randers-Pehrson, Justine D. (1993). Barbarians and Romans: The Birth Struggle of Europe, A.D. 400–700. Norman and London: University of Oklahoma Press. ISBN 978-0-80612-511-4.
- Spickermann, Wolfgang (2015). "Arianische Vandalen, katholische Provinzialrömer und die Rolle kirchlicher Netzwerke im Nordafrika des 5. Jh. n. Chr.". In Daniel Bauerfeld; Lukas Clemens (eds.). Gesellschaftliche Umbrüche und religiöse Netzwerke: Analysen von der Antike bis zur Gegenwart (in German). Bielefeld: Transcript Verlag. pp. 65–86. ISBN 978-3-83762-595-0.
- Wiemer, Hans-Ulrich (2023). Theoderic the Great: King of Goths, Ruler of Romans. New Haven and London: Yale University Press. ISBN 978-0-30025-443-3.
- Wolfram, Herwig (1988). History of the Goths. Berkeley and Los Angeles: University of California Press. ISBN 0-520-05259-5.
- Wolfram, Herwig (1997). The Roman Empire and its Germanic Peoples. Berkeley and Los Angeles: University of California Press. ISBN 0-520-08511-6.

Regnal titles
Preceded by Gunthamund	King of the Vandals; 496–523	Succeeded by Hilderic
