= Gunthamund =

King of the Vandals and Alans (ruled 484–496)

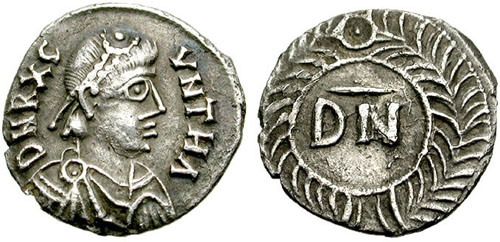
- A "50 denarii" of Gunthamund

King of the Vandals and Alans
- Reign: 484–496 AD
- Predecessor: Huneric
- Successor: Thrasamund
- Born: c. 450
- Died: 496 (age 46)
- Father: Gento
- Religion: Arianism

Gunthamund (c. 450–496) was king of the Vandals and Alans and third king of the North African Vandal Kingdom, ruling from 484–496. He succeeded his unpopular uncle Huneric, and for that reason alone, enjoyed a rather successful reign.

Gunthamund was the second son of Gento, the fourth and youngest son of Gaiseric, the founder of the Vandal Kingdom. Because most of Gaiseric's immediate family was dead, his elder brothers having been murdered by Huneric, When Huneric died on 23 December 484, Gunthamund was the eldest male member of the family. In accordance with Gaiseric's laws on succession, which decreed that the oldest member of the family would be the successor, he was proclaimed king.

Gunthamund benefited throughout his reign from the fact that the Vandals' most powerful rivals, the Visigoths, Ostrogoths, and the Byzantine Empire, were all heavily involved in wars. Although the Vandals' power had fallen off greatly since its zenith under Gaiseric, they enjoyed peace under Gunthamund. While he was also an Arian, Gunthamund eased up on Huneric's persecutions of Chalcedonian Christians, which reduced unrest in the kingdom, and stabilized the kingdom's economy, which had been on the verge of collapse.

After Gunthamund's death, Thrasamund became king.

Regnal titles
| Preceded by Huneric | King of the Vandals; 23 December 484 – 496 | Succeeded by Thrasamund |
