= Huneric =

King of the Vandals and Alans (ruled 477–484)

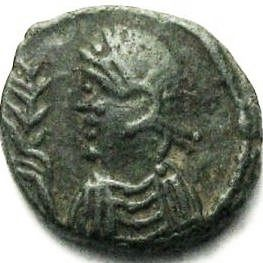
- Obverse of a possible "4 nummi" of Huneric, minted c. 480-533

King of the Vandals and Alans
- Reign: 477–484
- Predecessor: Gaiseric
- Successor: Gunthamund
- Born: c. early 5th century
- Died: December 23, 484
- Spouse: Eudocia
- Issue: Hilderic
- Father: Gaiseric
- Religion: Arianism

Huneric, Hunneric or Honeric (died December 23, 484 AD) was king of the Vandals and Alans and the second king of the North African Vandal Kingdom, ruling from 477–484 AD, and the oldest son of his predecessor Gaiseric. He abandoned the imperial politics of his father and concentrated mainly on internal affairs. He was married to Eudocia, daughter of western Roman Emperor Valentinian III (ruled 425–455 AD) and his wife Licinia Eudoxia. The couple had one child, the future king Hilderic.

Huneric was the first Vandal king to use the title King of the Vandals and Alans (Latin: Regnum Vandalorum et Alanorum). Despite adopting this title and the Vandals maintaining their sea-power and their hold on the islands of the western Mediterranean, Huneric did not have the prestige that his father Gaiseric had enjoyed with other states.

== Early life ==
Huneric was a son of King Gaiseric, and was sent to Italy as a hostage in 435, when his father made a treaty with the Western emperor Valentinian III. Huneric became king of the Vandals on his father's death on 25 January 477. Like Gaiseric, he was an Arian, and his reign is chiefly memorable for his persecution of Nicene Christians in his dominions.

A peace treaty was signed between the Vandals and Romans in 442, in which the Vandals acquired the most fertile regions of Roman Africa. A marriage alliance between Huneric and Eudocia, daughter of Emperor Valentinian III, when she was four years old, was also made. However, Huneric was already married to the daughter of Visigothic king Theodoric I. He divorced her under the claim that she attempted to poison somebody. She returned to the Visigothic Kingdom after her nose and ears were cut off. This action soured relations between the Vandals and Visigoths, who are not known to have attempted contact until 467. Huneric married Eudocia in 455 or 456, after she was taken following the Sack of Rome. Huneric renounced his claims to Eudocia's inheritance in 478.

Hilderic was born from this marriage between c. 456 and 471. Eudocia died after sixteen years of marriage according to the 9th century chronicler Theophanes the Confessor.

== Reign ==
Huneric conducted a purge in 479. He had his older brother Theoderic, along with his daughters and younger son, and the eldest son of his brother Gento, along with his wife, exiled. Theoderic's wife and eldest son were executed along with Heldica, one of Gaiseric's officials, and his family. Jucundus, the Arian patriarch of Carthage and a supporter of Theoderic, was publicly burned to death.

Huneric was a fervent adherent to Arianism. Yet his reign opened with making a number of positive overtures towards the local Roman population. Following the visit of a diplomatic mission from the Eastern Roman Empire led by Alexander, Huneric restored properties seized by his father from the merchants of Carthage.

Quodvultdeus, the bishop of Carthage, was expelled to Campania by the Vandals in 439. The position remained vacant for fifteen years until Gaiseric allowed Deogratias to be appointed on 24 October 454 at the request of Valentinian III. The position was made vacant again for twenty-four years after the death of Deogratias. Huneric lifted the policy of persecuting the Nicene Christians, allowing them to hold a synod wherein they elected Eugenius of Carthage as the bishop of Carthage. However, not long after the ordination of Eugenius, Huneric reversed himself and began to once again persecute Nicenes. In 484, he ordered that the tongues and right hand of all Nicenes in Tipasa be cut off due to them celebrating the liturgy.

Furthermore, he tried to make Nicene property fall to the state, but when this caused too much protest from the Eastern Roman Emperor, he chose to banish a number of Nicene Christians to a faraway province instead. On February 1, 484 he organized a meeting of Nicene bishops with Arian bishops, but on February 24, 484 he forcibly removed the Nicene bishops from their offices and banished some to Corsica. A few were executed, including the former proconsul Victorian along with Frumentius and other wealthy merchants, who were killed at Hadrumetum after refusing to become Arians. Yves Modéran estimated that around 20% of the bishops in Africa converted to Arianism in response to the persecution. However, Huneric died that year and his successor, Gunthamund, allowed those exiled to return. Among those exiled was Vigilius, bishop of Thapsus, who published a theological treatise against Arianism.

Additionally, Huneric murdered many members of the Hasdingi dynasty and also persecuted Manichaeans. Towards the end of his reign, the Moors in the Aurès Mountains (in modern-day Algeria) successfully rebelled from Vandal rule.

Only three pieces of legislation from the Vandal Kingdom exist today in partial or total form and all three came from the reign of Huneric.

== Legacy ==
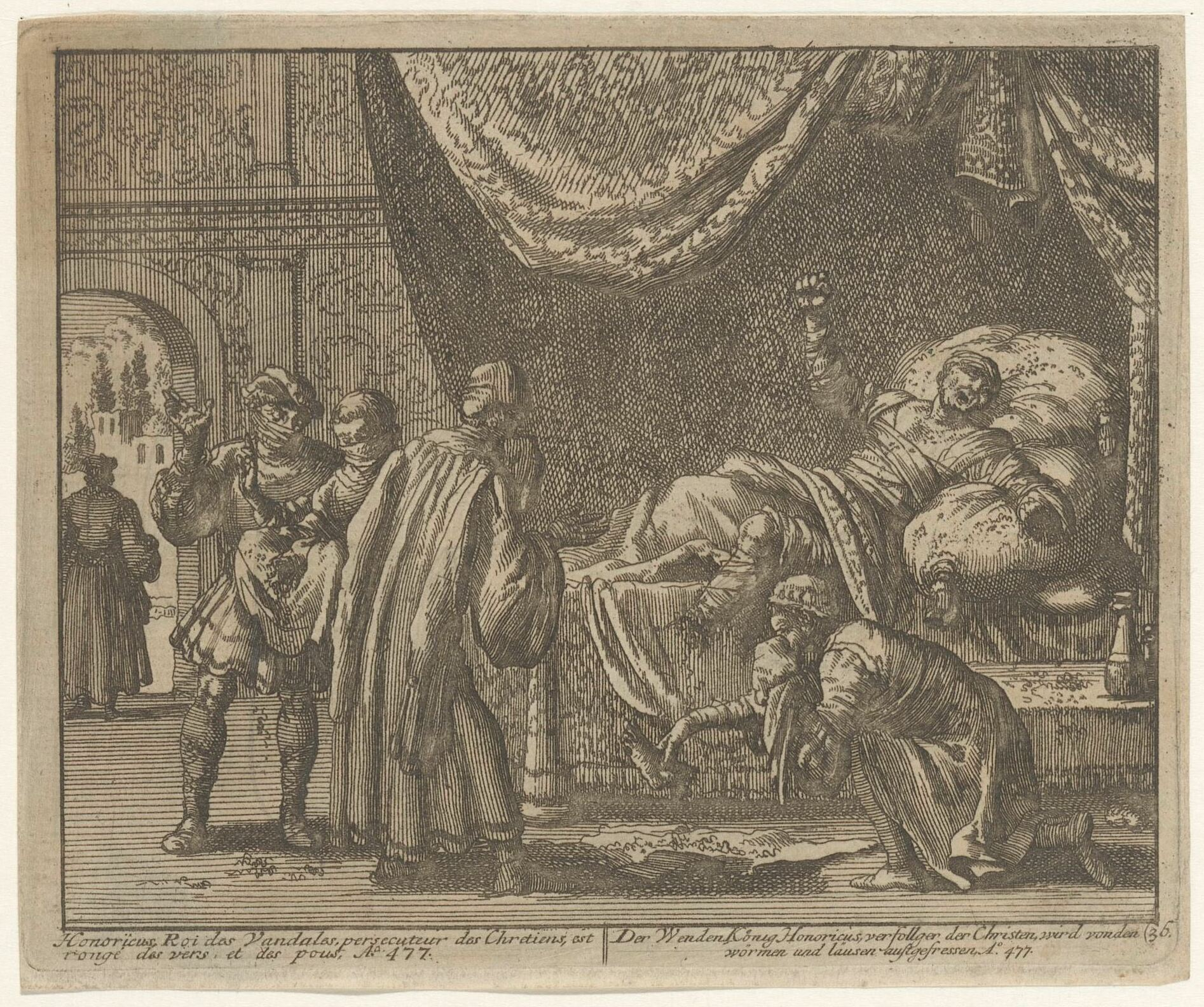
A 17th century engraving depicting the death of Huneric from putrefaction by Jan Luyken, 1685.

Huneric renamed Hadrumetum to Hunericopolis, in honor of himself.

Upon his death Huneric was succeeded by his nephew Gunthamund, who reigned until 496. A lurid account of Huneric's death by putrefaction and "an abundance of worms" is included in the Historia persecutionis Africanae Provinciae, temporibus Genserici et Hunirici regum Vandalorum (History of the African Province Persecution, in the Times of Genseric and Huneric, the Kings of the Vandals), written by his contemporary, Victor of Vita, although it is probable that this particular section was added at a later date.

== See also ==
- Hunericopolis, the Nicene Metropolitan Archbishopric Hadrumetum renamed after him

== Works cited ==
- Conant, Jonathan (2012). Staying Roman: Conquest and Identity in Africa and the Mediterranean, 439–700. Cambridge University Press. ISBN 9781139048101.
- Fournier, Éric (2017). "The Vandal Conquest of North Africa: The Origins of a Historiographical Persona". The Journal of Ecclesiastical History. 68 (4). Cambridge University Press: 687–718. doi:10.1017/S0022046916002827.
- Szada, Marta (2024). Conversion and the Contest of Creeds in Early Medieval Christianity. Cambridge University Press. ISBN 9781009426435.

Regnal titles
| Preceded by Gaiseric | King of the Vandals; 25 January 477 – 23 December 484 | Succeeded by Gunthamund |
