= 530s =

Decade

The 530s decade ran from January 1, 530, to December 31, 539.

== Events ==
=== By place ===
==== Byzantine Empire ====
- December 15 – Emperor Justinian I selects a second commission to excerpt and codify the writings of the jurists on Roman law. This becomes the Digest (Pandects).
- Tribonian becomes quaestor sacri palatii and chief editor of the compilation of the old Roman lawyers' writings.

==== Persia ====
- Spring – Battle of Dara: Belisarius and Hermogenes (magister officiorum) defeat a combined Persian-Arab army of 50,000 men at Dara (modern Turkey), by entrenching his infantry in a refused position in the centre line, then carrying out a cavalry envelopment to culminate a classic defensive-offensive battleplan.
- Summer – Battle of Satala: A Byzantine cavalry force (30,000 men) under command of Sittas defeats a major Persian invasion into Roman Armenia.

==== Africa ====
- King Hilderic is deposed by his cousin Gelimer after a seven-year reign. Gelimer restores Arianism as the official religion of the Vandal Kingdom and puts Hilderic in prison along with other supporters.
- Justinian I sends an embassy to Carthage to negotiate with Gelimer. Gelimer replies: “Nothing is more desirable than that a monarch should mind his own business.”

==== China ====
- Emperor Xiao Zhuang Di is arrested and imprisoned in a Buddhist temple at Jinyang (Shanxi). He is succeeded by Chang Guang Wang, who becomes the new ruler of Northern Wei.
- Xiao Tong, eldest son of emperor Wu Di, compiles the Wen Xuan (Literary Selections), a famous anthology of works dating from the Han to the Liang dynasty (approximate date).

=== By topic ===
==== Art ====
- The mosaic synagogue floor from Maon (Judea) is made. It is now kept at the Israel Museum in Jerusalem (approximate date).
- The Vishnu Temple at Deogarh, Uttar Pradesh (India) is built.

==== Religion ====
- September 22 – Pope Felix IV dies at Rome after a tenure of four years, two months and 13 days, in which he has condemned semi-pelagianism. He is succeeded by Boniface II, who becomes the 55th pope.
- October 14 – Dioscorus is elected as antipope in the Lateran Palace, but he dies within a month, thus ending the schism.
- Brendan, Irish abbot, allegedly climbs to the top of Mount Brandon to look for the Americas (approximate date).

=== By place ===
==== Byzantine Empire ====
- April 19 – Battle of Callinicum: A Byzantine army (20,000 men), commanded by Belisarius, is defeated by the Persians at Raqqa (northern Syria). Emperor Justinian I negotiates an end to the hostilities, and Belisarius is hailed as a hero.
- Some members of the Blue and Green chariot racing factions in Constantinople are imprisoned for murder, precipitating the Nika riots the next year.

==== Europe ====
- The Franks under King Chlothar I march against the Thuringi with Chlothar's nephew Theudebert I. The Kingdom of Thuringia comes under Frankish domination.
- Hermanafrid, last king of the Thuringi, is defeated by the Franks near the Unstrut River. During negotiations he is pushed from the town walls of Zülpich (northern Germany).
- King Childebert I receives pleas from his sister Clotilde, wife of King Amalaric, claiming that she is abused by her husband. Childebert invades Septimania (Gaul).
- Childebert I defeats the Visigoths and conquers the capital Narbonne. Amalaric flees south to Barcelona, where he is assassinated by his own men.
- Clotilde returns with the Frankish army and dies on the journey home. She is buried in Paris alongside her father Clovis I.
- Theudis, sword-bearer of former king Theodoric the Great, succeeds Amalaric as new ruler of the Visigoths.

==== Persia ====
- King Kavad I, age 82, dies after a 43-year reign. Khosrau I, his favourite son, is proclaimed successor over his elder brothers.

==== Asia ====
- The reign of Chang Guang Wang, ruler of Northern Wei, ends. Gao Huan, Chinese general, begins a rebellion and declares another member of the imperial clan, An Ding Wang, emperor.
- Ankan, age 66, succeeds his father Keitai as the 27th emperor of Japan.
- Anwon becomes ruler of the Korean kingdom of Goguryeo.

==== Unidentified ====
- Major volcanic eruption.

=== By place ===
==== Byzantine Empire ====
- January 11 – Nika riots in Constantinople: Anger among the supporters of the most important chariot teams—the Blues and the Greens—escalates into violence towards the emperor. For the next five days the capital is in chaos. The fires that start during the tumult result in the destruction of much of the city. The insurrection is put down a week later by Belisarius and Mundus; 30,000 people are killed in the Hippodrome.
- February 23 – Emperor Justinian I orders the building of a new Orthodox Christian basilica in Constantinople – the Hagia Sophia. He chooses Isidore of Miletus and Anthemius of Tralles as architects. The material for the construction is brought from all over the empire, such as large stones from quarries in Porphyry, Egypt. More than 10,000 people are employed.
- September – Justinian I signs a peace treaty, the "Eternal Peace", with the Persian king Khosrau I, ending the Iberian War (527-531). Both sides agree to return all occupied territories, and Justinian makes a one-off payment of 110 centenaria (11,000 pounds of gold), as a contribution to the defense of the Caucasus passes.

==== Europe ====
- Battle of Autun - The Franks, under command of King Childebert I and his brother Chlothar I, invade the Kingdom of Burgundy. They defeat the Burgundians under King Godomar near Autun (modern France).

==== Asia ====
- An Ding Wang commits suicide, and is succeeded by Xiao Wu Di as Chinese emperor of Northern Wei.
- Silla conquers the city-state of Geumgwan Gaya (Korea) during the Three Kingdoms period.

=== By topic ===
==== Arts and sciences ====
- First year in which the Anno Domini calendar is used for numbering the years.

==== Religion ====
- October 17 – Pope Boniface II dies in Rome after a tenure of two years, four months and six days.

=== By place ===
==== Byzantine Empire ====
- Spring – Vandalic War: Anti-Vandal revolt in Tripolitania and Sardinia; Gelimer, king of the Vandals, dispatches the bulk of the Vandal fleet (120 ships and 5,000 men) under his brother Tzazo to Sardinia. Byzantine forces from Cyrenaica occupy Leptis Magna and Tripolis.
- March 25 – In a letter, Emperor Justinian I declares the Bishop of Rome (currently John) to be "head of all Bishops, and the true and effective corrector of heretics."
- Summer – Emperor Justinian I holds a war council in Constantinople. His advisers warn him against launching an expedition to North Africa, because of the supply-lines (1,000 miles into Vandal waters) and the huge drain on the imperial treasury. Justinian appoints Belisarius to command the Byzantine army.
- June 21 – A Byzantine expeditionary fleet under Belisarius sails in 500 transports, escorted by 92 war vessels (dromons), manned by 20,000 seamen from Constantinople, to attack the Vandals in Africa, via Greece and Sicily. The fleet carries 10,000 infantry, about half Byzantine and half foederati, and 5,000 cavalry, consisting of 3,000 Byzantine horsemen, 1,000 foreign allies (Huns and Heruli) and 1,500 of Belisarius' retainers (bucellarii). On the flagship Belisarius is accompanied by his military secretary Procopius, and his wife Antonina.
- September – Belisarius arrives at Sicily, which he uses as a staging area, with the permission of the Ostrogoth queen Amalasuntha, daughter of Theodoric the Great and regent of Italy. The Ostrogoths help him with supplies and the fleet is prepared for the final attack.
- September 9 – The Byzantine army lands at Caput Vada (modern Tunisia). Belisarius marches his army northwards, towards Carthage (over 140 miles), following the coast, accompanied by the fleet and shadowed by Gelimer. During the march, the Vandal towns fall without a fight.
- September 13 – Battle of Ad Decimum: Gelimer attempts to ambush the Byzantines in a defile at the "10th milestone" from Carthage; due to inadequate coordination and the alertness of Belisarius, the attack is repulsed and the Vandals are scattered into the desert. Belisarius enters the capital and orders his soldiers not to kill or enslave the population. The fleet is stationed in the Lake of Tunis.
- December 15 – Battle of Tricamarum: Gelimer assembles an army of about 50,000 men at Bulla Regia (Numidia), and advances towards Carthage. Belisarius moves out to meet the Vandals; he leads the Byzantine cavalry (5,000 men) into battle. Without waiting for his infantry to come up, he charges, despite odds of almost 10-to-1, and throws Gelimer in confusion. Belisarius captures the Vandal camp by storm. Tzazo is killed in an all-cavalry fight, and Gelimer is forced to seek refuge in the mountains of Tunis with the Berbers.
- December 16 – The Digesta or Pandectae, a collection of jurist writings and other sources, is completed (see Corpus Juris Civilis).

==== Europe ====
- Theudebert I succeeds his father Theuderic I and becomes king of Austrasia.

=== By topic ===
==== Religion ====
- January 2 – After an interregnum of 2 months and 15 days, Pope John II becomes the 56th pope of Rome, and the first to adopt a regnal name upon elevation to the papacy (his birth name, Mercurius, being of pagan origin).

=== By place ===
==== Byzantine Empire ====
- January 1 – Decius Paulinus enters the office of consul (the last to hold this office in the West).
- March – King Gelimer surrenders to Belisarius, after spending a winter in the mountains of Numidia. He and large numbers of captured Vandals are transported to Constantinople. The Vandal Kingdom ends, and the African provinces return to the Byzantine Empire.
- April – Belisarius leaves a small force in Africa under the Byzantine general Solomon, to continue the subjugation of the province. He is appointed governor (Exarch) and pacifies the Moorish tribes with success. Malta becomes a Byzantine province (until 870).
- Summer – Belisarius arrives in Constantinople and is permitted by Emperor Justinian I to celebrate a triumph, the first non-imperial triumph for over 500 years. In the procession the spoils of the Temple of Jerusalem and the Vandal treasure are paraded.
- Justinian I commemorates the victory against the Vandals by stamping medals in his honor with the inscription "Gloria Romanorum" (approximate date).
- November 16 – A second and final revision of the Codex Justinianus is published.

==== Europe ====
- Toledo becomes the capital of the Visigothic Kingdom that controls the Iberian Peninsula. King Theudis expands Visigoth rule in the southern regions (Hispania Baetica).
- The Frankish kings Childebert I and Chlothar I overthrow Godomar, king of the Burgundians, and end the Kingdom of Burgundy.
- Cynric becomes king of Wessex.
- October 2 – King Athalaric dies of tuberculosis, age 18, having dissipated his youth in drink and debauchery. His mother, Amalasuntha, proposes to her cousin Theodahad, the kingdom's largest landowner and her father's last male heir, that he share the throne with her but that he will be king of the Ostrogoths in name only. Theodahad has secret conversations with the Byzantine ambassador, and promises to turn over Tuscany in exchange for a large sum of money, the rank of senator, and permission to live at Constantinople.

=== By place ===
==== Europe ====
- April 30 – King Theodahad revenges himself upon Queen Amalasuintha. He has her taken from the capital of Ravenna to a small island on Lake Bolsena, where she is strangled in her bath.
- The death of Amalasuintha gives Byzantine Emperor Justinian I a pretext to invade Italy and begin the Gothic War.
- The Byzantine city of Justiniana Prima is founded, and later becomes a bishop's seat of the Central Balkans.

==== Byzantine Empire ====
- Gothic War: Emperor Justinian I appoints Belisarius commander-in-chief (stratēgos autokratōr), and sends a Byzantine expeditionary force of only 8,000 soldiers (half are heavy East Roman cavalry) to begin the reconquest of Italy.
- Summer – Belisarius lands in Sicily and meets little opposition, save for the Gothic garrison of Palermo. Laying siege to the citadel, he blockades the harbour with his ships. Mundus invades Dalmatia and captures its capital, Salona.
- Justinian I issues the Lex Julia and declares that a wife has no right to bring criminal charges of adultery against a husband. This makes divorce almost impossible in the Byzantine Empire.
- December 31 – Belisarius completes the conquest of Sicily, defeating the Gothic garrison of Palermo (Panormos), and ending his consulship for the year.

==== Africa ====
- Spring – Solomon defeats the Moorish rebels at Mount Mammes and Mount Bourgaon. He secures Byzacena (modern Tunisia) and establishes fortifications along the Numidian border.
- April – Justinian I reorganises the province as an African prefecture, centered in Carthage. He restores frontier defences, and returns property to the Catholic Church.

==== Asia ====
- The Northern Wei dynasty ends: The northern region of China is split into the Eastern Wei and the Western Wei during a civil war. The first ruler is Wen Di; he makes his son Fei Di crown prince.
- Significant to the history of agriculture, Chinese author Jia Sixia writes the treatise "Chimin Yaoshu" in this year, and although it quotes 160 previous Chinese agronomy books, it is the oldest existent Chinese agriculture treatise. In over 100,000 written Chinese characters, the book covers land preparation, seeding, cultivation, orchard management, forestry, animal husbandry, trade, and culinary uses for crops.
- Reports of the eruption of Krakatoa (Java), which possibly led to several years of climate change (see Extreme weather events of 535–536), are recorded in the Javanese Book of Kings.

=== By topic ===
==== Religion ====
- May 8 – Pope John II dies in Rome after a two-year reign, and is succeeded by Agapetus I as the 57th pope. Agapetus is sent by King Theodahad on an embassy to Constantinople.
- Byzantine troops drive the extremist Monophysite party out of Alexandria, and establish Theodosius I as patriarch of the Eastern Orthodox Church.
- Anthimus I becomes patriarch of Constantinople (535–536).
- A Christian basilica is completed at Leptis Magna in North Africa.

==== Meteorology ====
- The weather is reported to be unusually cold and dark in multiple parts of the world; see Extreme weather events of 535–536.

=== By place ===
==== Eastern Roman ("Byzantine") Empire ====
- Spring – Emperor Justinian I appoints his cousin Germanus as magister militum to deal with the crisis in Africa. He sends a mobile force of comitatenses (mostly cavalry) and an elite guard. Solomon, the previous magister militum, returns to Constantinople.
- Summer – Gothic War (535–554): Belisarius crosses the Strait of Messina and invades Italy. He conquers the city of Rhegium and advances to Naples.
- November – Siege of Naples: Belisarius captures Naples after a month's siege, by sending troops into the city through an abandoned Roman aqueduct.
- December 9 – Belisarius enters Rome through the Porta Asinaria, and the Gothic garrison of 4,000 men flees the city. He sends an urgent request for reinforcements to Justinian I, meanwhile preparing Rome for a siege, by bringing in great quantities of food and other supplies.
- Winter – Belisarius sets up his headquarters on the Pincian Hill, and repairs the neglected city walls of Rome. He stations a 5,000-man garrison, of whom half are his personal bodyguard (bucellarii). To hold parts of the city, he recruits 20,000 young Romans to man the walls.

==== Europe ====
- Early in 536 (possible) – Volcanic winter of 536: Famine is described in the Annals of Ulster.
- March – Ostrogothic King Theodahad cedes Provence and upper Alamannia to the Franks, gaining their support in the war. He sends a large Gothic army into Dalmatia. They defeat the Byzantines, Mundus is killed during the fighting at Salona, and the Byzantine army withdraws.
- Summer – Constantinianus, magister militum per Illyricum, retakes Dalmatia. The Goths abandon Salona and withdraw to the north. The Byzantines rebuild its walls and reclaim the province.
- December – Vitiges deposes his rival Theodahad at Ravenna, and marries Mataswintha (daughter of queen Amalasuintha). He becomes king of the Ostrogoths and assembles an army to fight against Belisarius.

==== Africa ====
- March – April – Belisarius sails to Carthage with 1,000 men, to suppress a mutiny against Solomon. Meanwhile, Carthage is besieged by 9,000 rebels, including many Vandals, under Stotzas.
- Battle of the River Bagradas: Belisarius defeats the mutineers, and hurries back to Sicily.

==== Asia ====
- January 26 – Senka succeeds his brother Ankan as the 28th emperor of Japan.
- August – Volcanic winter of 536: Snow falls in China, which causes the harvest to be delayed.

=== By topic ===
==== Religion ====
- Before March 13 – Anthimus I is deposed as patriarch of Constantinople in favour of Menas.
- April 22 – Pope Agapetus I dies in Constantinople, after a reign of just ten months. He is succeeded by Silverius as the 58th pope.
- May 2–June 4 – Council of Constantinople.
- September 19 – Council of Jerusalem.
- The Little Hagia Sophia in Constantinople (begun in 527) is completed as the Church of Saints Sergius and Bacchus.

==== Climate ====
- The volcanic winter of 536, thought to have been caused by an extensive veil of dust in the atmosphere, began in the Northern Hemisphere. It continued until the following year, causing unseasonal weather and crop failure worldwide.

=== By place ===
==== Byzantine Empire ====
- March 2 – Siege of Rome: The Ostrogothic army (45,000 men) under King Vitiges begins the siege of the city. Belisarius conducts a delaying action outside the Flaminian Gate; he and a detachment of his bucellarii are almost cut off.
- Vitiges sets up seven camps, overlooking the main gates and access routes to the city, in order to starve it out. He blocks the Roman aqueducts that are supplying Rome with water, necessary both for drinking and for operating the corn mills.
- March 21 – Vitiges attempts to assault the northern and eastern city walls with four siege towers, but is repulsed at the Praenestine Gate, known as the Vivarium, by the defenders under the Byzantine generals Bessas and Peranius.
- April – The Goths capture the Portus Claudii at Ostia; the harbor is left unguarded by the Romans. Belisarius is forced to unload his supplies at Antium; he sends urgent messages for reinforcements to Constantinople.
- April 9 – Belisarius receives his promised reinforcements: 1,600 cavalry, mostly of Hunnic or Slavic origin and expert bowmen. Despite shortages, he starts raids against the Gothic camps and Vitiges is forced into a stalemate.
- June – In Rome, famine brings the city to despair; Belisarius sends his secretary Procopius to Naples for more reinforcements and supplies. Vitiges arranges a three-month armistice for Gothic envoys to travel to Constantinople.
- November – Belisarius brings his long-awaited reinforcements, namely 3,000 Isaurians and 1,800 cavalry embarked in Ostia, along with a supply convoy, safely to Rome. The Goths are forced to abandon the Portus Claudii.
- December – Belisarius sends John "the Sanguinary" with a force of 2,000 men towards Picenum, to plunder the east coast of Italy. He arrives at Ariminum (Rimini), where he is welcomed by the local population.
- December 27 – The construction of the Hagia Sophia in Constantinople (begun in 532) is completed.

==== Britain ====
- Battle of Camlann: King Arthur fights his last battle against the forces of his rebellious son (or nephew) Mordred, and is mortally wounded (traditional date)

==== Africa ====
- Spring – Battle of Scalas Veteres (6 km south of Carthage, in the Praetorian prefecture of Africa): Byzantine troops under Germanus crush a large-scale mutiny. Stotzas, leader of the rebellion, flees with a handful of followers to Mauretania.

==== Asia ====
- Eastern Wei sends an advance guard of three army columns through the Tong Pass, to attack Western Wei. The Western army under Yu-Wen Tai defeats one of the columns while the others retreat. Yu-Wen follows up, but runs into the main Eastern army (200,000 men). The Westerners are pushed back through the pass, and the Eastern army emerges from the mountains. Unexpectedly they are charged in the flank by 10,000 Western cavalry, and 6,000 Easterners are killed and 70,000 captured.
- John Cottistis starts a short-lived rebellion against Justinian I. He is declared emperor at Dara, but is killed four days later by conspiring soldiers.

==== America ====
- Yaxchilan captures the ajaws of Bonampak, Lakamtuun, and Calakmul, at the outset of the First Tikal-Calakmul War.

=== By topic ===
==== Construction ====
- The Aqua Virgo aqueduct is destroyed by the Goths; they try to use the underground channel as a secret route to invade Rome.

==== Religion ====
- March 29 – Pope Vigilius succeeds Silverius as the 59th pope, when the latter is deposed by Belisarius at the order of Justinian I.

==== Society ====
- Second year of worldwide famine, a consequence of the extreme weather events of 535–536. (Note: Famine is described as "AI537.1, Failure of bread" in the Annals of Inisfallen.)

=== By place ===
==== Byzantine Empire ====
- March 12 – Siege of Rome: King Vitiges of the Ostrogoths ends his siege (after 374 days) and abandons Rome. He retreats with his Gothic army northeast along the Via Flaminia.
- Belisarius attacks the Goths when they have crossed the Milvian Bridge. After fierce resistance, Vitiges routs in panic, and many are slain or drowned in the river.
- Gothic War: Vitiges strengthens the garrisons of various towns and besieges Ariminum. Byzantine forces under the Armenian general Narses arrive at Picenum.
- April – Belisarius secures Liguria, Mediolanum (modern Milan) and Ariminum, but disagreements, especially with Narses, leads to disunity in the Byzantine army.
- Summer – King Theudebert I sends a small Frankish force across the Alps, and defeats the Goths and Byzantines at the River Po. Belisarius retreats to Tuscany.
- Sittas, Byzantine general, suppresses a revolt in Armenia in protest against heavy taxation. During the campaign he is killed by Artabanes, leader of the revolt.

==== Britain ====
- King Cuneglas of Rhos abandons his wife in favour of his sister-in-law, a nun who he drags from her convent (approximate date).
- Gabrán mac Domangairt becomes king of Dál Riata (Scotland).

==== Asia ====
- King Seong of Paekche (Korea) moves the capital from Ungjin (present-day Gongju) further south to Sabi (present-day Buyeo County), on the Geum River. He sends a diplomatic mission that formally introduces Buddhism to the Japanese imperial court (see also 552).
- The Kofun period ends and the Asuka period, the second part of the Yamato period in Japan, begins.

=== By topic ===
==== Religion ====
- As a result of persecutions by the Byzantine Empire, Monophysite Christians establish the Coptic Church in Alexandria (approximate date).
- The Third Council of Orléans takes place, and prohibits rural labor on Sunday.

==== Society ====
- Third year of worldwide famine, a consequence of the Extreme weather events of 535–536. (Note: Famine is described as "T538.1, Failure of bread" in the Annals of Tigernach.)

=== By place ===
==== Byzantine Empire ====
- March – Gothic War: The Goths and the Burgundians recapture Mediolanum (modern Milan), after many months of siege, the city reaching the point of starvation. The Byzantine garrison (1,000 men) surrenders and is spared, but the inhabitants are massacred (according to Procopius 300,000 people are murdered), and the city itself is destroyed.
- Belisarius, still besieging Ravenna, negotiates a treaty with Theodebert I (whose forces are suffering from dysentery), and the Franks retreat to Gaul. The Byzantine fleet controls the Adriatic Sea and blockades the port of the capital from supplies.
- Emperor Justinian I becomes alarmed by renewed barbarian incursions across the Danube frontier from the Slavs, the Bulgars, the Gepids, and the Avars.
- November 29 – Antioch is struck by an earthquake.

==== Europe ====
- Walthari murders his uncle Wacho and becomes king of the Lombards.

==== Asia ====
- Kinmei succeeds his brother Senka, and ascends as 29th emperor to the throne of Japan.

=== By topic ===
==== Society ====
- Fourth year of worldwide famine, a consequence of the Extreme weather events of 535–536. (Note: Famine is described as "U539.1, Failure of bread" in the Annals of Ulster.)

== Significant people ==
- Justinian I - The Byzantine Emperor who reigned from 527 to 565. He is known for his ambitious project to codify Roman law, resulting in the Corpus Juris Civilis, and for his efforts to reconquer lost Western Roman territories.
- Belisarius - A prominent general under Justinian I, known for his military campaigns against the Persians, Vandals, and Ostrogoths.
- Tribonian - A legal scholar and advisor to Justinian I, who played a crucial role in compiling the Corpus Juris Civilis.
- Gelimer - The last Vandal king of North Africa, who was defeated by Belisarius in 534.
- Pope Felix IV - The Pope from 526 to 530, known for his efforts to combat semi-Pelagianism.
- Laozi - The legendary Chinese philosopher and founder of Taoism, traditionally believed to have died around 531 BC.
- Heraclitus of Ephesus - A pre-Socratic Greek philosopher born around 535 BC, known for his doctrine that change is central to the universe.

== Births ==
530

- Colmán of Cloyne, Irish monk (d. 606)
- Dallán Forgaill, Irish poet (approximate date)
- Sophia, Byzantine Empress (approximate date)
- Venantius Fortunatus, Latin poet and bishop (approximate date) (d. 600)
- Xuan Di, emperor of the Chen dynasty (d. 582)

531

- Li Delin, Chinese official and writer (d. 591)
- Liu Jingyan, Chinese Empress (d. 615)
- Waldrada, Lombard princess (d. 572)
- Yan Zhitui, Chinese scholar and official (d. 591)

532

- Áedán mac Gabráin, king of Dál Riata (Scotland) (approximate date)
- Guntram, king of Burgundy (approximate date)
- Marius Aventicensis, bishop of Aventicum (d. 596)
- Xiao Mohe, general of the Chen dynasty and Sui dynasty (d. 604)

534

- Leander, bishop of Seville (approximate date)
- Liu Jingyan, empress of the Chen dynasty (d. 616)
- Ming Di, emperor of the Northern Zhou (d. 560)
- * Taliesin, Welsh poet (approximate date)

535

- Abu Talib ibn Abd al-Muttalib, uncle of the prophet Muhammad, father of Ali Ibn Abi Talib (d. 619)
- Evagrius Scholasticus, Syrian scholar (approximate date)
- Sigebert I, king of Austrasia (approximate date)
- Theudebald, king of Austrasia (approximate date)
- Xiao Zhao Di, emperor of Northern Qi (d. 561)

536

- unknown date – Li Ezi, Chinese empress dowager of Northern Zhou (d. 588)
- probable
  - Evagrius Scholasticus, Syrian church historian (or 537) (d. 594)
  - Venantius Fortunatus, Merovingian bishop and poet (d. c. 600/609)

537

- Agilulf, bishop of Metz (approximate date)
- Chen Chang, prince of the Chen dynasty (d. 560)
- Gong Di, emperor of Western Wei (d. 557)
- Wu Cheng Di, emperor of Northern Qi (d. 569)

538

- Emperor Bidatsu of Japan (d. 585)
- Gregory of Tours, French bishop, historian (d. 594)
- Zhiyi, de facto founder of Tiantai Buddhism (d. 597)

539

- Abu Talib ibn Abd al-Muttalib, leader of the Banu Hashim and uncle of Muhammad (d. 619)
- Bertha, wife of Æthelberht of Kent
- Chilperic I, king of Neustria (approximate date)
- Maurice, emperor of the Byzantine Empire (d. 602)

== Deaths ==
530

- September 22 – Pope Felix IV
- October 14 – Antipope Dioscorus
- Cador, king of Dumnonia (England)
- Dhu Nuwas, king of Himyar (b. circa 450)
- Drest III, king of the Picts (approximate date)
- Erzhu Rong, general of Northern Wei (b. 493)
- Xiao Baoyin, prince of Southern Qi (b. 487)

531

- May 30 – Xiao Tong, prince of the Liang Dynasty (b. 501)
- Amalaric, king of the Visigoths (assassinated)
- Clotilde, Visigoth queen and daughter of Clovis I
- Drest IV, king of the Picts (approximate date)
- Hermanafrid, king of the Thuringi (murdered)
- Kavadh I, king of the Persian Empire (b. 449)
- Keitai, emperor of Japan (b. 450)
- Maine mac Cearbhall, king of Uí Maine (or 537)
- Xiao Zhuang Di, emperor of Northern Wei (b. 507)

532

- March 3 – Winwaloe, saint and founder of Landévennec Abbey (b.c. 460)
- October 17 – Pope Boniface II
- An Ding Wang, emperor of Northern Wei (b. 513)
- Chang Guang Wang, emperor of Northern Wei
- Ecclesius, bishop of Ravenna (approximate date)
- Erzhu Shilong, official of Northern Wei (b. 500)
- Erzhu Tianguang, general of Northern Wei (b. 496)
- Guntheuc, princess of Burgundy (approximate date)
- Hypatius, Byzantine nobleman (executed)
- Jie Min Di, emperor of Northern Wei (b. 498)
- Pompeius, Byzantine politician (executed)
- Sabbas the Sanctified, monk and saint (b. 439)

533

- January 13 – Remigius, bishop of Reims
- Erzhu Zhao, general of Northern Wei
- Fulgentius of Ruspe, bishop (approximate date)
- Hilderic, king of the Vandals and Alans
- Theuderic I, king of Austrasia (or 534)
- Tzazo, brother of Gelimer (killed in battle)

534

- October 2 – Athalaric, king of the Ostrogoths
- Anthemius of Tralles, architect and mathematician (approximate date)
- Cerdic, first king of Wessex
- Godomar, king of Burgundy
- Marcellinus Comes, Latin chronicler (approximate date)
- Theuderic I, king of Austrasia (or 533)

535

- May 8 – Pope John II
- June 5 – Epiphanius, patriarch of Constantinople
- Eugippius, disciple and biographer
- Timothy III, Coptic Orthodox Patriarch of Alexandria
- Xie He, Chinese writer and art historian (approximate date)
- Xu Mian, official of the Liang dynasty (b. 466)
- Xiao Wu Di, emperor of Northern Wei (b. 510)

536

- January 25 – Ankan, emperor of Japan (b. c. 466)
- April 22 – Pope Agapetus I
- December – Theodahad, king of the Ostrogoths (assassinated) (b. c. 480)
- unknown date – Mundus, Gepid Byzantine general (killed in action)

537

- December 2 – Pope Silverius
- King Arthur, King of the Britons, in the Battle of Camlann (historicity debated)
- Mordred, son (or nephew) of King Arthur, also in the Battle of Camlann
- Fortunatus, Bishop of Todi
- Gartnait I, King of the Picts
- Husi Chun, general of Northern Wei (b. 495)
- Isidore of Miletus, Byzantine architect
- John Cottistis, Byzantine usurper
- Maine mac Cearbhall, king of Uí Maine (or 531)
- Vigor, Bishop of Bayeux

538

- February 8 – Severus of Antioch, patriarch of Antioch
- Cailtram, king of the Picts (approximate date)
- Comgall mac Domangairt, king of Dál Riata (approximate date)
- Damascius, Byzantine philosopher
- Saint Manchan, Irish Saint.
- Sittas, Byzantine general (magister militum)

539

- Senka, emperor of Japan
- Wacho, king of the Lombards
