= 533 =

Calendar year

533 in various calendars
- Gregorian calendar: 533; DXXXIII
- Ab urbe condita: 1286
- Assyrian calendar: 5283
- Balinese saka calendar: 454–455
- Bengali calendar: −61 – −60
- Berber calendar: 1483
- Buddhist calendar: 1077
- Burmese calendar: −105
- Byzantine calendar: 6041–6042
- Chinese calendar: 壬子年 (Water Rat); 3230 or 3023 — to — 癸丑年 (Water Ox); 3231 or 3024
- Coptic calendar: 249–250
- Discordian calendar: 1699
- Ethiopian calendar: 525–526
- Hebrew calendar: 4293–4294
- Hindu calendars
- Vikram Samvat: 589–590
- Shaka Samvat: 454–455
- Kali Yuga: 3633–3634
- Holocene calendar: 10533
- Iranian calendar: 89 BP – 88 BP
- Islamic calendar: 92 BH – 91 BH
- Javanese calendar: 420–421
- Julian calendar: 533; DXXXIII
- Korean calendar: 2866
- Minguo calendar: 1379 before ROC 民前1379年
- Nanakshahi calendar: −935
- Seleucid era: 844/845 AG
- Thai solar calendar: 1075–1076
- Tibetan calendar: ཆུ་ཕོ་བྱི་བ་ལོ་ (male Water-Rat); 659 or 278 or −494 — to — ཆུ་མོ་གླང་ལོ་ (female Water-Ox); 660 or 279 or −493

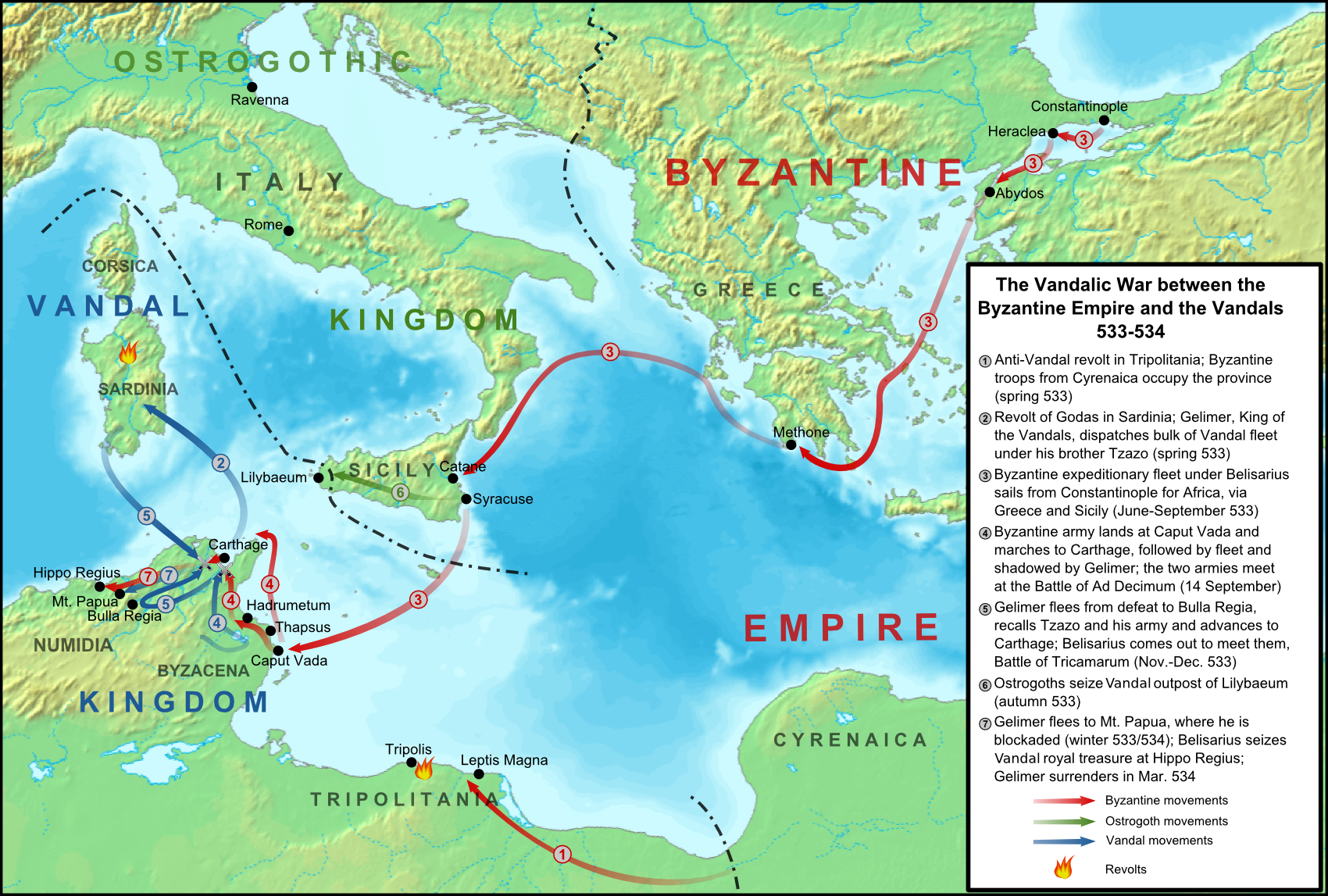
The Vandalic War campaign (533–534)

Year 533 (DXXXIII) was a common year starting on Saturday of the Julian calendar. At the time, it was known as the Year of the Consulship of Iustinianus without colleague (or, less frequently, year 1286 Ab urbe condita). The denomination 533 for this year has been used since the early medieval period, when the Anno Domini calendar era became the prevalent method in Europe for naming years.

== Events ==
=== By place ===
==== Byzantine Empire ====
- Spring – Vandalic War: Anti-Vandal revolt in Tripolitania and Sardinia; Gelimer, king of the Vandals, dispatches the bulk of the Vandal fleet (120 ships and 5,000 men) under his brother Tzazo to Sardinia. Byzantine forces from Cyrenaica occupy Leptis Magna and Tripolis.
- March 25 – In a letter, Emperor Justinian I declares the Bishop of Rome (currently John) to be "head of all Bishops, and the true and effective corrector of heretics."
- Summer – Emperor Justinian I holds a war council in Constantinople. His advisers warn him against launching an expedition to North Africa, because of the supply-lines (1,000 miles into Vandal waters) and the huge drain on the imperial treasury. Justinian appoints Belisarius to command the Byzantine army.
- June 21 – A Byzantine expeditionary fleet under Belisarius sails in 500 transports, escorted by 92 war vessels (dromons), manned by 20,000 seamen from Constantinople, to attack the Vandals in Africa, via Greece and Sicily. The fleet carries 10,000 infantry, about half Byzantine and half foederati, and 5,000 cavalry, consisting of 3,000 Byzantine horsemen, 1,000 foreign allies (Huns and Heruli) and 1,500 of Belisarius' retainers (bucellarii). On the flagship Belisarius is accompanied by his military secretary Procopius, and his wife Antonina.
- September – Belisarius arrives at Sicily, which he uses as a staging area, with the permission of the Ostrogoth queen Amalasuntha, daughter of Theodoric the Great and regent of Italy. The Ostrogoths help him with supplies and the fleet is prepared for the final attack.
- September 9 – The Byzantine army lands at Caput Vada (modern Tunisia). Belisarius marches his army northwards, towards Carthage (over 140 miles), following the coast, accompanied by the fleet and shadowed by Gelimer. During the march, the Vandal towns fall without a fight.
- September 13 – Battle of Ad Decimum: Gelimer attempts to ambush the Byzantines in a defile at the "10th milestone" from Carthage; due to inadequate coordination and the alertness of Belisarius, the attack is repulsed and the Vandals are scattered into the desert. Belisarius enters the capital and orders his soldiers not to kill or enslave the population. The fleet is stationed in the Lake of Tunis.
- December 15 – Battle of Tricamarum: Gelimer assembles an army of about 50,000 men at Bulla Regia (Numidia), and advances towards Carthage. Belisarius moves out to meet the Vandals; he leads the Byzantine cavalry (5,000 men) into battle. Without waiting for his infantry to come up, he charges, despite odds of almost 10-to-1, and throws Gelimer in confusion. Belisarius captures the Vandal camp by storm. Tzazo is killed in an all-cavalry fight, and Gelimer is forced to seek refuge in the mountains of Tunis with the Berbers.
- December 16 – The Digesta or Pandectae, a collection of jurist writings and other sources, is completed (see Corpus Juris Civilis).

==== Europe ====
- Theudebert I succeeds his father Theuderic I and becomes king of Austrasia.

=== By topic ===
==== Religion ====
- January 2 – After an interregnum of 2 months and 15 days, Pope John II becomes the 56th pope of Rome, and the first to adopt a regnal name upon elevation to the papacy (his birth name, Mercurius, being of pagan origin).

== Deaths ==
- January 13 – Remigius, bishop of Reims
- Erzhu Zhao, general of Northern Wei
- Fulgentius of Ruspe, bishop (approximate date)
- Hilderic, king of the Vandals and Alans
- Theuderic I, king of Austrasia (or 534)
- Tzazo, brother of Gelimer (killed in battle)
