= Godas =

Gothic nobleman of the Vandal kingdom and ruler of Sardinia (died 533)

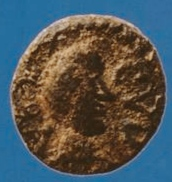
- Bronze coin with a bust of Godas, inscribed: REX CVDA

King of Vandal Sardinia
- Reign: 533 AD
- Predecessor: Gelimer
- Successor: Gelimer
- Died: 533 AD; Cagliari
- Religion: Arianism

Godas (Original form possibly Cuda; (Note: The name is attested in this form on bronze coins he minted.) died 533) was a Gothic nobleman of the Vandal kingdom in North Africa. King Gelimer of the Vandals made him governor of the Vandalic province of Sardinia, but Godas stopped forwarding the taxes he collected and declared himself ruler of Sardinia.

In 533, he began communicating with Justinian I, Byzantine emperor, as an independent sovereign, clearly with the intent of creating his own principality out of the island of Sardinia. In reaction, Gelimer sent a large army composed of most of the available soldiers in Africa to Sardinia under his brother Tzazo to put down the rebellion. According to Procopius, Tzazo landed at Cagliari and immediately captured the city, killing Godas and the soldiers with him. A military expedition sent to support him by Justinian failed to reach Godas in time.

Godas' revolt proved fatal to the Vandal kingdom; for while Tzazo was away with the bulk of the Vandal forces, a Byzantine army commanded by Belisarius landed unopposed near Caputvada with the intention of restoring North Africa to the Byzantine Empire. Belisarius then defeated the remaining Vandal troops and captured Carthage before Gelimer summoned Tzazo back home.

== Bibliography ==
- Onnis, Omar; Mureddu, Manuelle (2019). Illustres. Vita, morte e miracoli di quaranta personalità sarde (in Italian). Sestu: Domus de Janas. ISBN 978-88-97084-90-7. OCLC 1124656644.
