= Battle of Ad Decimum =

533 battle during the Vandalic War

- Part of the Vandalic War
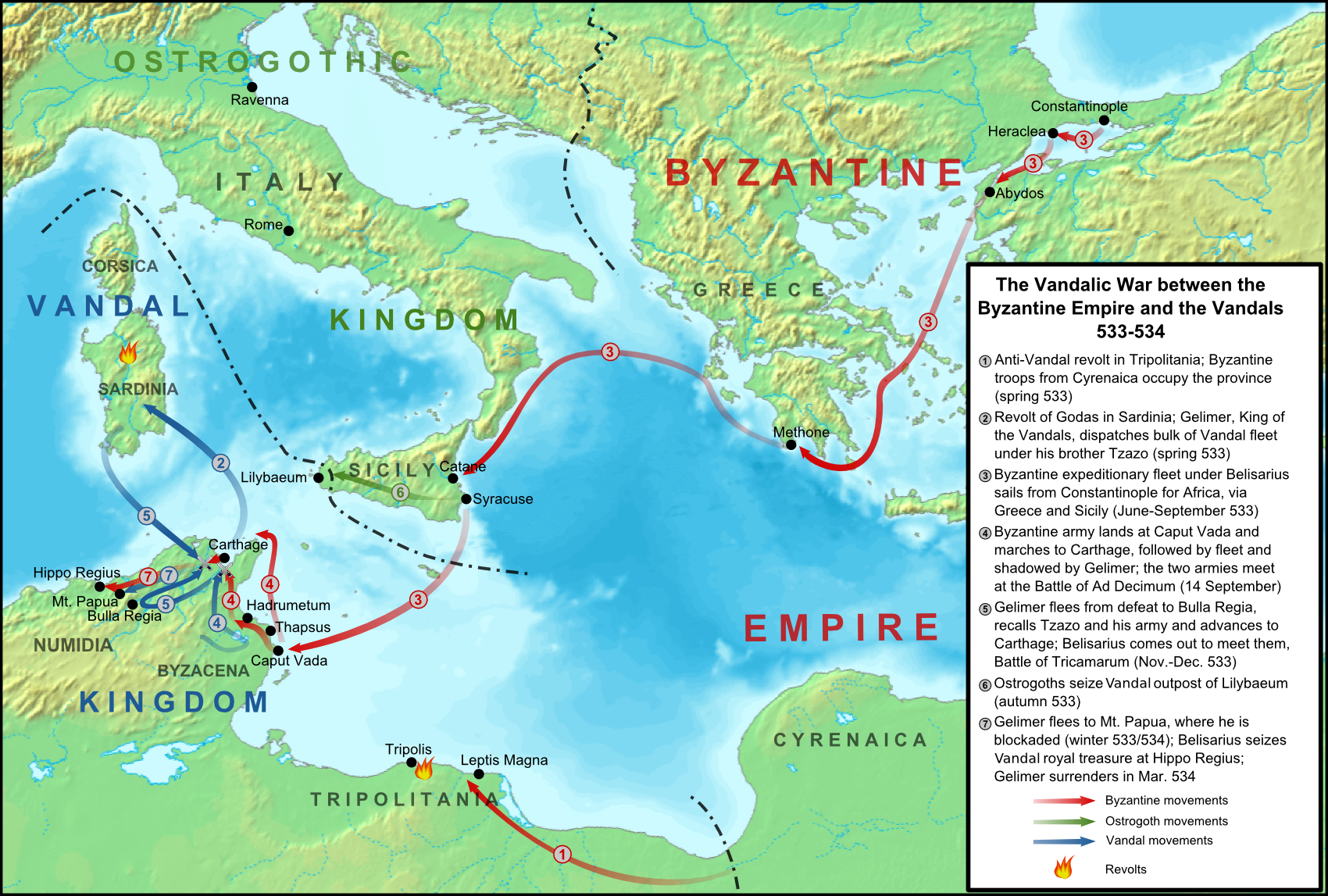
- A map of the Vandalic War 533–534
Date	13 September 533 AD
Location	Near Carthage and modern-day Tunis 36.765°N 10.225°E
Result	Byzantine victory

Belligerents
Byzantine Empire	Vandal Kingdom

Commanders and leaders
Belisarius; John the Armenian; Calonymus	Gelimer; Ammatas †

Strength
10,000 infantry; 5,000 cavalry; 600 Huns; 400 Heruls	Unknown (Note: Mostly cavalry forces. Procopius reports 80,000 men, but modern historians consider no more than 30,000–40,000, though it is unclear how many the Vandal king was able to muster in the battle. Historian Ian Hughes estimates that Gelimer had 10,000–12,000 men.)

The Battle of Ad Decimum took place on 13 September 533 between the armies of the Vandals, commanded by King Gelimer, and the Byzantine Empire, under the command of General Belisarius.

The Vandal Kingdom under King Hilderic maintained close ties with Emperor Justinian I, but Hilderic's acceptance of Chalcedonian Christianity over Arianism led to his overthrow by his cousin Gelimer in 531. Refusing to recognize Gelimer's rule, Justinian launched an expedition in 533 under the command of Belisarius to restore imperial control over North Africa. After landing at Caputvada, the Byzantine army advanced toward Carthage, while Gelimer prepared an ambush at the narrows of Ad Decimum using coordinated attacks by his brother Ammatas, his nephew Gibamundus, and his own forces.

The plan unraveled when Ammatas and Gibamundus were defeated in separate engagements before Gelimer arrived. Although Gelimer initially drove back part of the Byzantine cavalry, he paused to mourn the death of his brother instead of pressing his advantage. Belisarius regrouped his cavalry and launched a counterattack, which found the Vandals in disorder and routed them. The Byzantine victory opened the road to Carthage, which was occupied with little resistance, and it marked the beginning of the end for the Vandal kingdom.

== Prelude ==
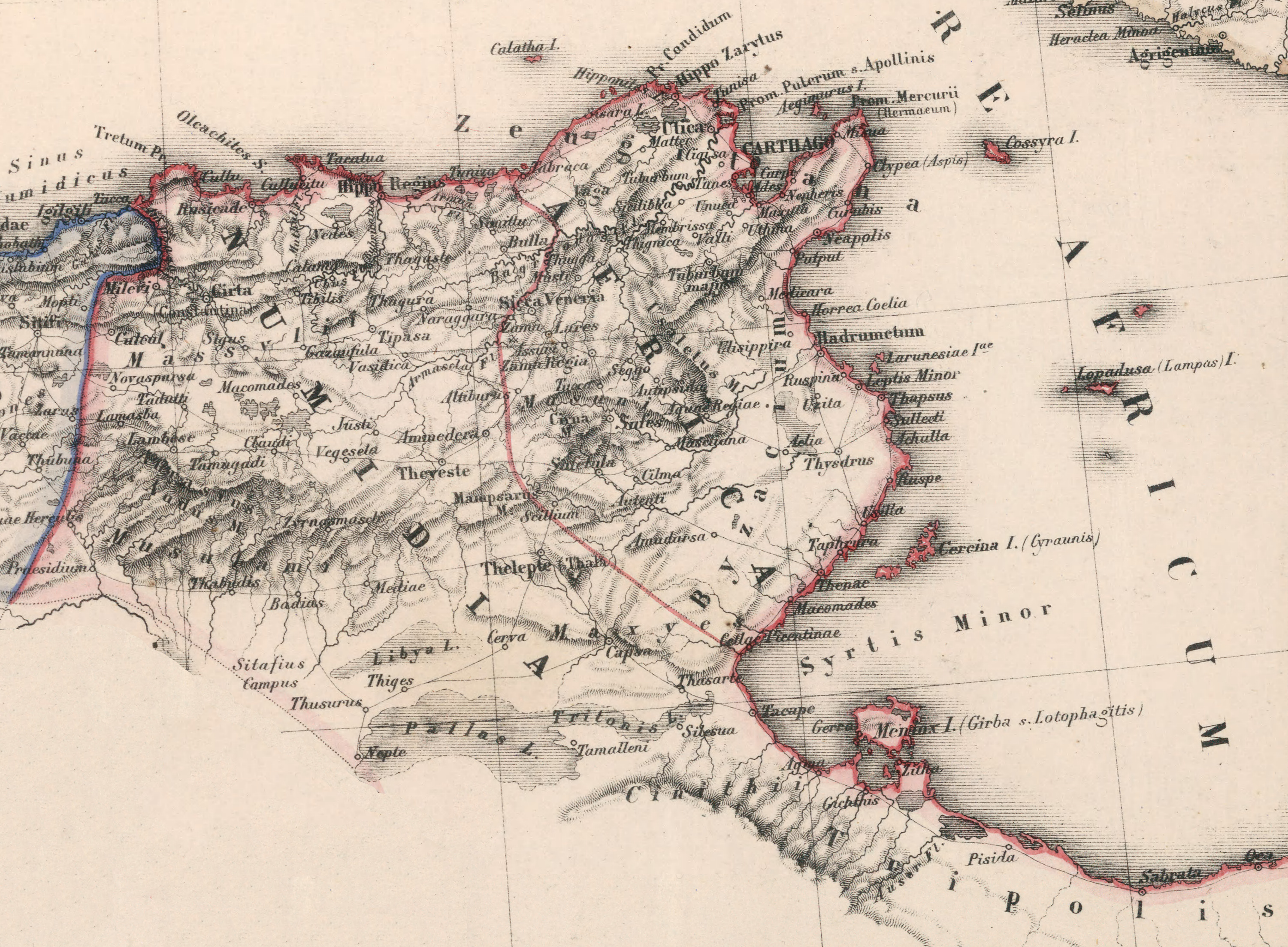
Map of the Byzantine North Africa, with the provinces of Byzacena, Zeugitana and Numidia

The Vandal Kingdom in North Africa was ruled by King Hilderic. His reign was noteworthy for the kingdom's excellent relations with the Byzantine Empire ruled by Emperor Justinian I. Procopius writes that he was "a very particular friend and guest-friend of Justinian, who had not yet come to the throne", noting that Hilderic and Justinian exchanged large presents of money with each other. Hilderic ceased the persecutions and allowed a new Chalcedonian bishop to take office in the Vandal capital of Carthage to the alarm of the Vandal nobility. Hilderic rejected the Arian Christianity that most Vandals followed. In 531, Hilderic was overthrown by his cousin Gelimer, a military commander who had campaigned successfully against the Moors. Gelimer sought to establish friendly relations with neighboring powers. He sent gifts to Justinian but the emperor refused them and rejected Gelimer's legitimacy. Gelimer also sought an alliance with the Ostrogoths in Italy, but Justinian forestalled this by instructing the court at Ravenna not to recognize him.

Two revolts further weakened the Vandal kingdom prior to Justinian's invasion of North Africa. The first was led by Pudentius in Tripolitania, who rebelled against Vandal rule and appealed to Justinian for assistance. The emperor responded by sending a small force, which joined Pudentius' troops and secured the province. The second revolt occurred in Sardinia under Godas, a Goth by birth, who also requested Justinian's support. Justinian first sent Eulogius to negotiate before dispatching 400 soldiers under Cyril, while simultaneously preparing the main invasion force for North Africa. Unable to respond to both rebellions, Gelimer abandoned plans to retake Tripolitania and instead sent his brother Tzazon with 5,000 Vandals on 150 ships to suppress the revolt in Sardinia. Historian JB Bury considers Gelimer's actions as "astounding blunders". Failing to recapture Tripolitania meant that the Byzantines could travel along the African coast and land near Carthage unopposed, and the Sardinia expedition deprived him of valuable troops and nearly the whole Vandal navy. The historian Ilkka Syvänne notes that the simultaneous uprisings suggest possible coordination through Justinian's intelligence network.

In June 533, Justinian sent the Byzantine general Belisarius to reconquer the former province of Byzantine North Africa. It consisted of 5,000 Byzantine cavalry, 10,000 infantry, 600 Huns and 400 Heruls. They traveled in a fleet of 500 transports, escorted by ninety-two dromons (warships) and in total 30,000 sailors. The fleet arrived safely in North Africa, and the Byzantine army disembarked at Caputvada. The Byzantines advanced toward Carthage, marching about 80 stades (15 km) a day and stopping each night in a town or camp with the navy keeping pace. Their route passed through the towns of Byzacena region: Sullectum, Thapsus, Leptis Parva, Hadrumentum, Horrea Caelia, Uppenna, and Pupput. Near Grassa, the main road to Carthage turned inland across the peninsula leading to Cape Bon. At this point, a skirmish between Byzantine and Vandal scouts prompted Belisarius to divide his forces. The army took the direct road to Carthage, while the naval commander, Calonymus, was instructed not to enter Carthage but to remain about 3 mi (4.8 km) offshore until summoned by Belisarius.

== Battle ==
On 13 September 533, Gelimer planned to ambush the Byzantines at the narrows of Ad Decimum. (Note: Ad Decimum (Latin for "at the tenth [mile post]"), was a marker along the Mediterranean coast road ten Roman miles (9.2 miles (14.8 km)) south of Carthage.) He ordered his brother Ammatas to execute the imprisoned royal family and march to Ad Decimum to block the path to Carthage while he would attack from the rear. He also dispatched his nephew Gibamundus with 2,000 men to reinforce his brother around the salt lake Sebkret es-Sedjoumi. Gelimer's plan was that when the Byzantines advanced through the narrows of Ad Decimum, they would find the path blocked by Gibamundus, who was ordered to attack them and push them back into the valley in disordered formation. Gelimer would then attack the Byzantines from the rear.

Belisarius did not know the Vandal dispositions so he wanted to gain intelligence about them before giving battle. He found a good spot for a fortified camp roughly four miles from Ad Decimum, leaving his infantry there while he advanced with his cavalry. Belisarius had not ordered the 300-strong contingent of scouts under John the Armenian or the 600 Huns guarding his left flank to stop so they kept advancing while Belisarius was still with his encamping infantry. In the meantime, two engagements took place. In the first one, Ammatus was scouting and had arrived with a few soldiers about half a day earlier than the appointed time, leaving the bulk of his army behind to follow. Ammatas encountered John's forces, where he was killed in the fighting after killing twelve Byzantines. His death triggered a Vandal rout, which spread to the reinforcements arriving in small groups. John's forces pursued the fleeing Vandals to the gates of Carthage. In the second encounter, the Byzantine Hun mercenaries met Vandal forces at Pedion Halon (the Salt Marsh) about 40 stades from Ad Decimum. Following their custom, a Hun warrior rode forward alone to initiate the battle. When the Vandals neither attacked nor fired missiles, he returned and declared that God had delivered the enemy into their hands. The Huns then charged, causing the Vandals to panic and flee.

Belisarius was unaware of the earlier fighting, when he sent his foederati cavalry forward to reconnoitre the narrows close to Ad Decimum while he followed with the rest of the cavalry. Hidden by the surrounding hills, neither army knew the other's position. At Ad Decimum, the foederati found the bodies of the twelve Byzantines and Ammatas. Local inhabitants explained what had happened, and scouts soon reported that Gelimer was approaching. They sent an urgent plea to Belisarius for support because they were outnumbered. The foederati hesitated because they argued over what the best course of action was, but soon they were driven back after an attack by the Vandals. Although Gelimer had the advantage, he discovered the body of his brother Ammatas and stopped to mourn instead of pressing the attack. This allowed Belisarius to rally his fleeing cavalry, and launch a counterattack, catching the Vandals in disorder. The Byzantines routed them, pursuing them until nightfall. The victory forced the Vandals to retreat toward the Plain of Bulla, leaving the road to Carthage open. By dusk, John's force and the Huns had rejoined the main army.

Development of the battle (Byzantine and Vandal forces are in blue and red color, respectively)
Initial Vandal plan, with the projected entrapment of the Byzantine army

First phase, the Byzantine advance parties defeat the Vandal flanking detachments

Second phase, Gelimer routs the foederati

Third phase, the final clash between Belisarius and Gelimer

== Aftermath ==
After the victory at Ad Decimum, the Byzantine troops spent the night near the battlefield to secure the pass. The infantry, accompanied by Belisarius's wife Antonina, arrived the next day and the army advanced to Carthage, reaching the city by evening. Although the gates were open and the city illuminated, Belisarius camped outside because he feared an ambush and wanted to prevent his troops from looting.

The Byzantine fleet arrived off Carthage the same day. The Vandals removed the harbor chain at Mandracium, while prisoners in the palace, including eastern merchants accused of supporting Justinian, were spared execution when their guards abandoned Gelimer, after learning of his defeat. The fleet, initially uncertain of the army's success, confirmed the Byzantine victory at Mercurium before sailing toward Carthage. Most ships anchored safely at Stagnum, but Calonymus ignored Belisarius's orders and entered Mandracium, where his sailors looted merchant property. The loss of Carthage deprived the Vandals of their main harbor and most of their fleet.

The following day Belisarius entered Carthage in battle formation. Finding no resistance, he occupied the palace, where local merchants complained about the naval looting. Unlike the sailors, the army maintained strict discipline. Soldiers were quartered peacefully, purchased supplies at market prices, and no disorder was reported. Belisarius repaired the neglected city walls and restored Orthodox control over churches previously held by Arian clergy. Gelimer reunited with his brother Tzazo and attempted to weaken the Byzantines by encouraging the Hunnic mercenaries of Belisarius to change sides and by disrupting Carthage's water and food supplies. Instead of waiting for a siege, Belisarius marched to Tricamarum, where he defeated the Vandals in the Battle of Tricamarum in December 533, marking the end of the Vandal Kingdom.
