= 534 =

Calendar year

534 in various calendars
- Gregorian calendar: 534; DXXXIV
- Ab urbe condita: 1287
- Assyrian calendar: 5284
- Balinese saka calendar: 455–456
- Bengali calendar: −60 – −59
- Berber calendar: 1484
- Buddhist calendar: 1078
- Burmese calendar: −104
- Byzantine calendar: 6042–6043
- Chinese calendar: 癸丑年 (Water Ox); 3231 or 3024 — to — 甲寅年 (Wood Tiger); 3232 or 3025
- Coptic calendar: 250–251
- Discordian calendar: 1700
- Ethiopian calendar: 526–527
- Hebrew calendar: 4294–4295
- Hindu calendars
- Vikram Samvat: 590–591
- Shaka Samvat: 455–456
- Kali Yuga: 3634–3635
- Holocene calendar: 10534
- Iranian calendar: 88 BP – 87 BP
- Islamic calendar: 91 BH – 90 BH
- Javanese calendar: 421–422
- Julian calendar: 534; DXXXIV
- Korean calendar: 2867
- Minguo calendar: 1378 before ROC 民前1378年
- Nanakshahi calendar: −934
- Seleucid era: 845/846 AG
- Thai solar calendar: 1076–1077
- Tibetan calendar: ཆུ་མོ་གླང་ལོ་ (female Water-Ox); 660 or 279 or −493 — to — ཤིང་ཕོ་སྟག་ལོ་ (male Wood-Tiger); 661 or 280 or −492

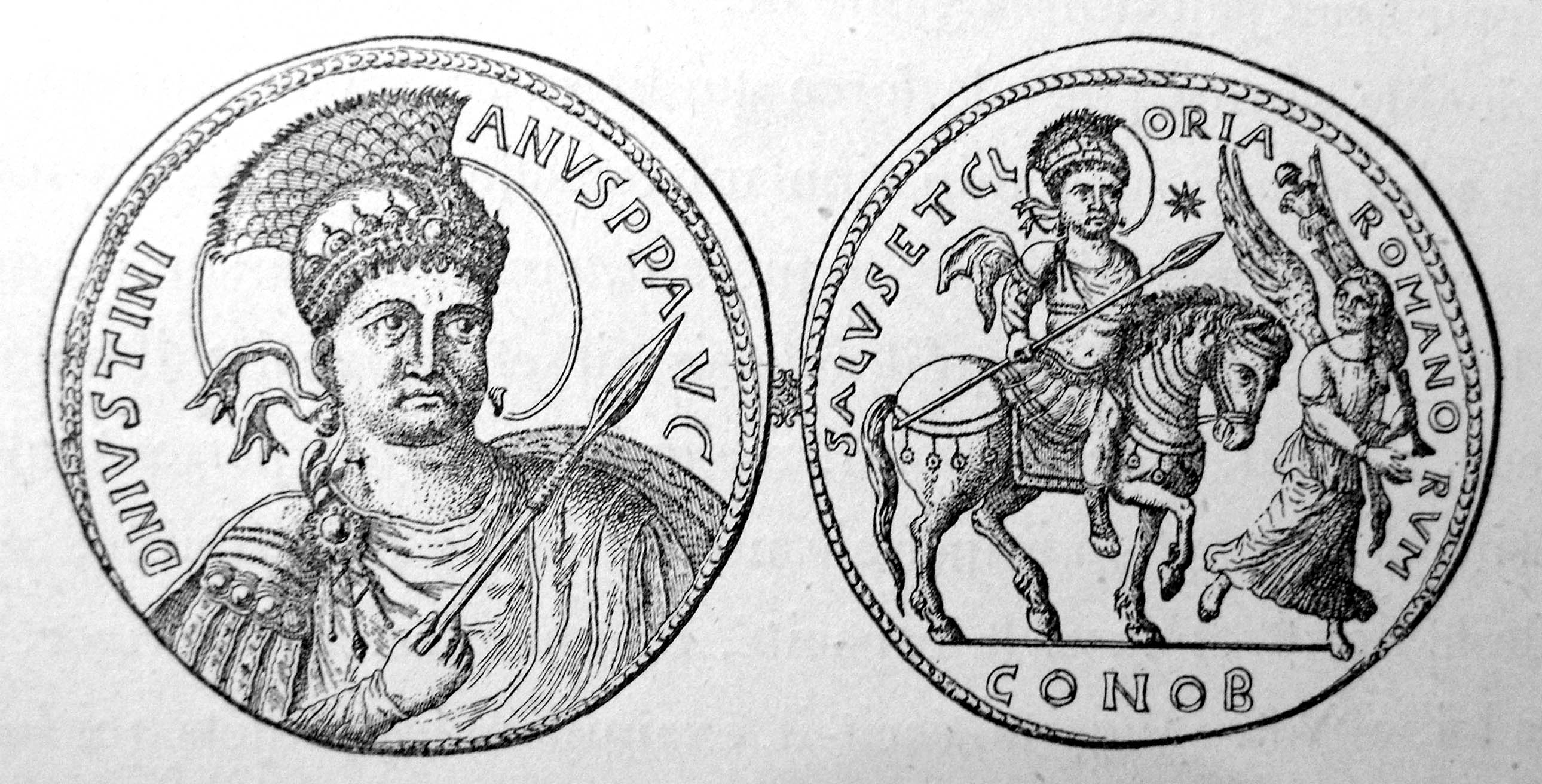
Medallion commemorating the Vandalic War

Year 534 (DXXXIV) was a common year starting on Sunday of the Julian calendar. At the time, it was known as the Year of the Consulship of Iustinianus and Paulinus (or, less frequently, year 1287 Ab urbe condita). The denomination 534 for this year has been used since the early medieval period, when the Anno Domini calendar era became the prevalent method in Europe for naming years.

== Events ==
=== By place ===
==== Byzantine Empire ====
- January 1 – Decius Paulinus enters the office of consul (the last to hold this office in the West).
- March – King Gelimer surrenders to Belisarius, after spending a winter in the mountains of Numidia. He and large numbers of captured Vandals are transported to Constantinople. The Vandal Kingdom ends, and the African provinces return to the Byzantine Empire.
- April – Belisarius leaves a small force in Africa under the Byzantine general Solomon, to continue the subjugation of the province. He is appointed governor (Exarch) and pacifies the Moorish tribes with success. Malta becomes a Byzantine province (until 870).
- Summer – Belisarius arrives in Constantinople and is permitted by Emperor Justinian I to celebrate a triumph, the first non-imperial triumph for over 500 years. In the procession the spoils of the Temple of Jerusalem and the Vandal treasure are paraded.
- Justinian I commemorates the victory against the Vandals by stamping medals in his honor with the inscription "Gloria Romanorum" (approximate date).
- November 16 – A second and final revision of the Codex Justinianus is published.

==== Europe ====
- Toledo becomes the capital of the Visigothic Kingdom that controls the Iberian Peninsula. King Theudis expands Visigoth rule in the southern regions (Hispania Baetica).
- The Frankish kings Childebert I and Chlothar I overthrow Godomar, king of the Burgundians, and end the Kingdom of Burgundy.
- Cynric becomes king of Wessex.
- October 2 – King Athalaric dies of tuberculosis, age 18, having dissipated his youth in drink and debauchery. His mother, Amalasuntha, proposes to her cousin Theodahad, the kingdom's largest landowner and her father's last male heir, that he share the throne with her but that he will be king of the Ostrogoths in name only. Theodahad has secret conversations with the Byzantine ambassador, and promises to turn over Tuscany in exchange for a large sum of money, the rank of senator, and permission to live at Constantinople.

== Births ==
- Leander, bishop of Seville (approximate date)
- Liu Jingyan, empress of the Chen dynasty (d. 616)
- Ming Di, emperor of the Northern Zhou (d. 560)
- * Taliesin, Welsh poet (approximate date)

== Deaths ==
- October 2 – Athalaric, king of the Ostrogoths
- Anthemius of Tralles, architect and mathematician (approximate date)
- Cerdic, first king of Wessex
- Godomar, king of Burgundy
- Marcellinus Comes, Latin chronicler (approximate date)
- Theuderic I, king of Austrasia (or 533)
