= Ammatus =

Vandal noble and military leader

Ammatus also spelled Ammatas (late 5th century – 533) was a Vandal noble and military leader. He was the brother of the Vandal king Gelimer. He had the previous Vandal king, Hilderic, executed on the orders of his brother. On his brother's orders he moved to support Gelimer himself in repulsing a Byzantine invasion at Ad Decimum. During that battle, he was killed.
