= 560 =

Calendar year

560 in various calendars
- Gregorian calendar: 560; DLX
- Ab urbe condita: 1313
- Armenian calendar: 9 ԹՎ Թ
- Assyrian calendar: 5310
- Balinese saka calendar: 481–482
- Bengali calendar: −34 – −33
- Berber calendar: 1510
- Buddhist calendar: 1104
- Burmese calendar: −78
- Byzantine calendar: 6068–6069
- Chinese calendar: 己卯年 (Earth Rabbit); 3257 or 3050 — to — 庚辰年 (Metal Dragon); 3258 or 3051
- Coptic calendar: 276–277
- Discordian calendar: 1726
- Ethiopian calendar: 552–553
- Hebrew calendar: 4320–4321
- Hindu calendars
- Vikram Samvat: 616–617
- Shaka Samvat: 481–482
- Kali Yuga: 3660–3661
- Holocene calendar: 10560
- Iranian calendar: 62 BP – 61 BP
- Islamic calendar: 64 BH – 63 BH
- Javanese calendar: 448–449
- Julian calendar: 560; DLX
- Korean calendar: 2893
- Minguo calendar: 1352 before ROC 民前1352年
- Nanakshahi calendar: −908
- Seleucid era: 871/872 AG
- Thai solar calendar: 1102–1103
- Tibetan calendar: ས་མོ་ཡོས་ལོ་ (female Earth-Hare); 686 or 305 or −467 — to — ལྕགས་ཕོ་འབྲུག་ལོ་ (male Iron-Dragon); 687 or 306 or −466

Year 560 (DLX) was a leap year starting on Thursday of the Julian calendar. The denomination 560 for this year has been used since the early medieval period, when the Anno Domini calendar era became the prevalent method in Europe for naming years.

== Events ==
=== By place ===
==== Europe ====
- Alboin succeeds his father Audoin after his death, as king of the Lombards.

==== Britain ====
- Adda succeeds his brother Glappa as king of Bernicia (approximate date).
- Ælla becomes king of Deira (this according to the Anglo-Saxon Chronicle).
- Ceawlin succeeds his father Cynric as king of Wessex (approximate date).
- Custennin ap Cado abdicates as king of Dumnonia (South West England).
- Elidyr of Strathclyde invades Gwynedd (Wales) and tries to expel his brother-in-law, King Rhun ap Maelgwn.

=== By topic ===
==== Religion ====
- Columba quarrels with Finnian of Moville over authorship of a psalter, leading to a pitched battle the next year.

== Births ==
- Abu Sufyan ibn Harb, Arabic leader (d. 652)
- Constantina, Byzantine empress (approximate date)
- Eustace of Luxeuil, abbot (approximate date)
- Isidore of Seville, archbishop and scholar
- Richarius, Frankish hermit and monk (approximate date)
- Sophronius, patriarch of Jerusalem (d. 638)
- Tassilo I, duke of Bavaria (d. 610)

== Deaths ==
- Aspasius of Auch, bishop of Éauze
- Audoin, king of the Lombards (approximate date)
- Chen Chang, prince of the Chen dynasty (b. 537)
- Clodoald, Merovingian prince (approximate date) (b. 522)
- Cynric, king of Wessex
- Domitian of Huy, Frankish bishop and saint
- Dorotheus of Gaza, monk and abbot (approximate date)
- Glappa, king of Bernicia (approximate date)
- Ming Di, emperor of Northern Zhou (b. 534)
- Thurisind, king of the Gepids (approximate date)
- Yang Yin, official of Northern Qi (b. 511)
