= Gelimer =

Last king of the Vandals and Alans (r. 530–534)

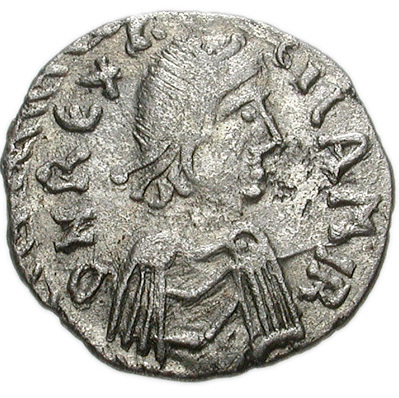
- Obverse of a "50 denarii" with a bust of Gelimer, inscribed: D N REX G-EILAMIR

King of the Vandals and Alans
- Reign: 530–534 AD
- Predecessor: Hilderic
- Successor: Monarchy abolished (Guntarith claimed in 546)
- Contender: Godas (533)
- Born: Roman Africa
- Died: Galatia
- House: Hasdingi
- Father: Gelarius
- Religion: Arianism

Gelimer (Note: Original form possibly Geilamir; the name is attested in this form on coins and an inscription on a missorium.) was the last Germanic king of the Vandals and Alans and the North African Vandal Kingdom, from 530 to 534. The great-grandson of Geiseric, he seized the throne after deposing his first cousin once removed, Hilderic, whose pro-Byzantine policies and religious tolerance toward Chalcedonian Christianity at the expense of Arianism had alienated much of the Vandal nobility.

Gelimer's rule was challenged by simultaneous revolts in Tripolitania and Sardinia, which Byzantine Emperor Justinian I exploited in the opening of the Vandalic War. In 533, the Byzantine general Belisarius invaded North Africa, defeating Gelimer at the Battle of Ad Decimum in September 533 and three months later at the Battle of Tricamarum. Following his defeat, Gelimer fled to the mountains of Numidia before surrendering in March 534, bringing the Vandal Kingdom to an end. He was taken to Constantinople, where he appeared in Belisarius's triumph. Justinian granted Gelimer estates in Galatia, where he lived in retirement until his death.

== Early life and rise to power ==
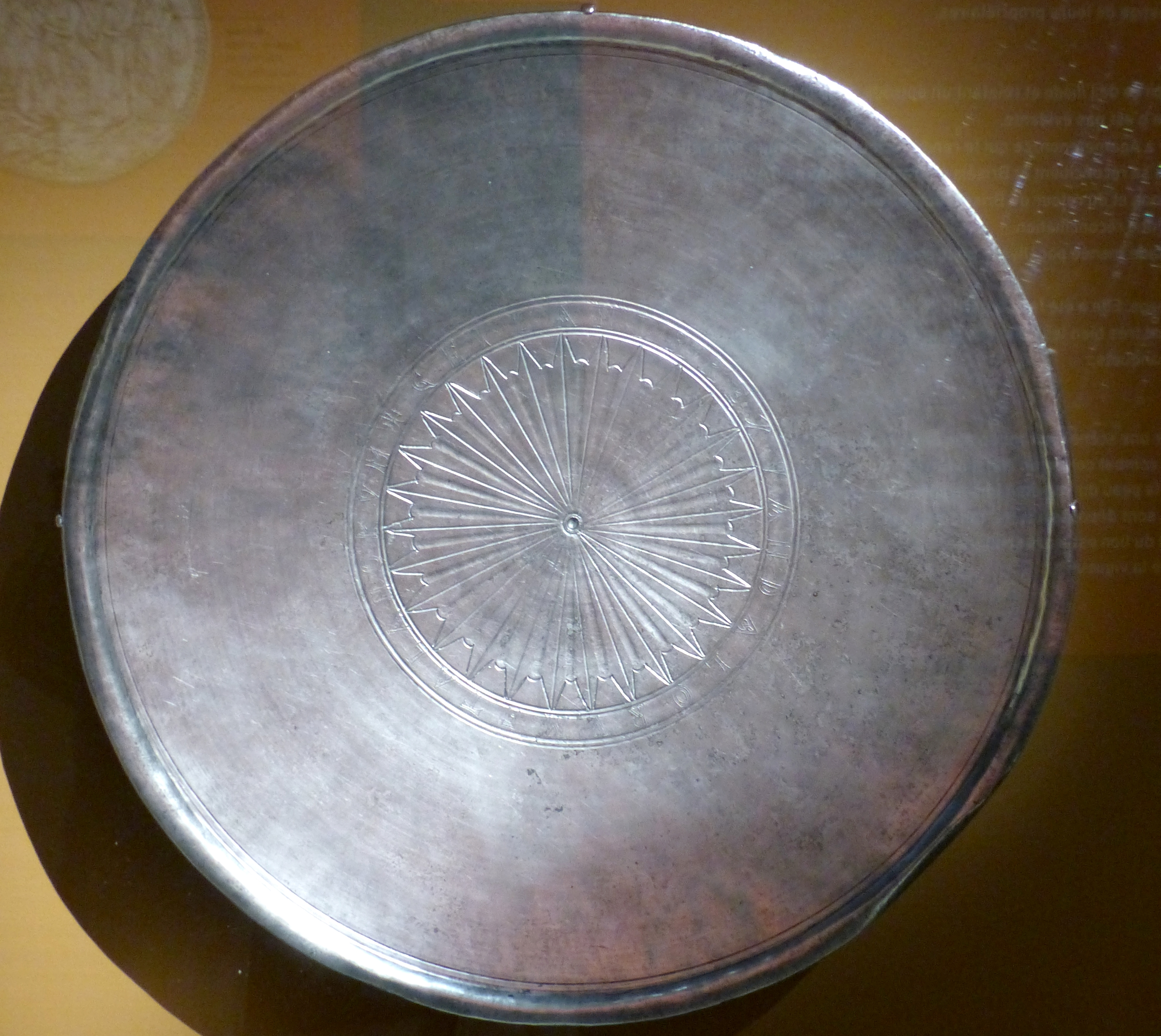
A decorated plate (missorium) of Gelimer, inscribed at the well: † GEILAMIR REX VANDALORVM ET ALANORVM (Bibliothèque nationale de France)

Little is known about Gelimer's early life; his date of birth is unknown. He was the son of Gelarius, the grandson of Gento, and the great-grandson of Geiseric, the latter of whom was the leader of the Vandals who played a role in the fall of the Western Roman Empire. He had two brothers, Ammatus and Tzazon. Gelimer became a military commander and had campaigned successfully against the Moors. Due to his lineage and seniority, apart from Hilderic, he was expected to inherit the throne. Despite his reputation as a skilled and clever soldier, he was also known for his eagerness to seize the wealth of others.

King Hilderic sought to normalize relations with the Byzantine Emperor Justinian I. Hilderic ceased persecutions and allowed a new Chalcedonian bishop to take office in the Vandal capital of Carthage to the alarm of the Vandal nobility. (Note: The introduction of Arian Christianity to the Vandal nobility is discussed in H.E. Gieseche 1939. Die Ostgermanen und Arianismus, esp. pp. 167–99; the notorious Vandal persecutions of Catholic Christians in North Africa, recounted by the Catholic bishop Victor of Vita, is translated by John R. C. Martyn, 2008. Arians and Vandals of the 4th–6th centuries: annotated translations of the historical works by bishops Victor of Vita (Historia persecutionis Africanae provinciae) and Victor of Tonnena... (Cambridge), reviewed in The Journal of Ecclesiastical History 61, pp. 579f.) Gelimer allied with the Moors and convinced the nobles to depose Hilderic by claiming that Hilderic was unwarlike and subservient to the Emperor. On 19 May 530, Gelimer imprisoned Hilderic and took the throne. (Note: The date is debated in literature, with some authors placing it in the following year. For more details see Bury (1958) p. 126) Soon after this, he sought to establish friendly relations with neighboring powers. He sent gifts to Justinian but the emperor refused them and rejected Gelimer's legitimacy. Gelimer also sought an alliance with the Ostrogoths in Italy, but Justinian forestalled this by instructing the court at Ravenna not to recognize him.

Two revolts further weakened the Vandal kingdom prior to Justinian's invasion of North Africa. The first was led by Pudentius in Tripolitania, who rebelled against Vandal rule and appealed to Justinian for assistance. The emperor responded by sending a small force, which joined Pudentius' troops and secured the province. The second revolt occurred in Sardinia under Godas, a Goth by birth, who also requested Justinian's support. Justinian first sent Eulogius to negotiate before dispatching 400 soldiers under Cyril, while simultaneously preparing the main invasion force for North Africa. Unable to respond to both rebellions, Gelimer abandoned plans to retake Tripolitania and instead sent his brother Tzazon with 5,000 Vandals on 150 ships to suppress the revolt in Sardinia. The historian J. B. Bury considers Gelimer's actions "astounding blunders". Failing to recapture Tripolitania meant that the Byzantines could travel along the African coast and land near Carthage unopposed, and the Sardinia expedition deprived him of valuable troops and nearly the whole Vandal navy. The historian Ilkka Syvänne notes that the simultaneous uprisings suggest possible coordination through Justinian's intelligence network.

== Vandalic War ==
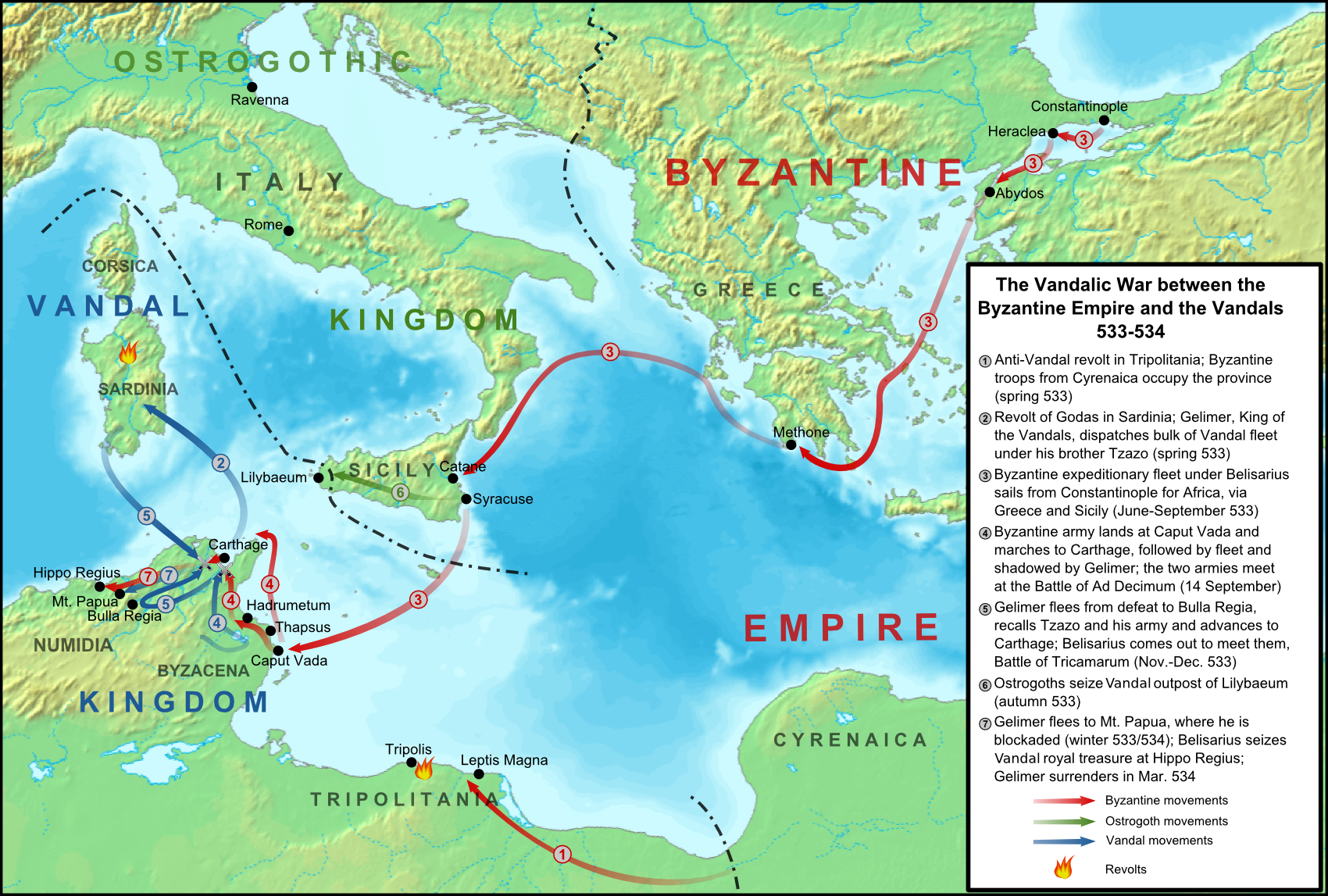
A map of the Vandalic War 533–534

In June 533, Justinian sent the Byzantine general Belisarius to reconquer the former province of Byzantine North Africa. The expeditionary force consisted of 5,000 Byzantine cavalry, 10,000 infantry, 600 Huns and 400 Heruls. They traveled in a fleet of 500 transports, escorted by ninety-two dromons (warships) and, in total, 30,000 sailors. The fleet arrived safely in North Africa, and the Byzantine army disembarked at Caputvada. The Byzantines advanced toward Carthage, marching about 80 stades (15 km) a day and stopping each night in a town or camp, with the navy keeping pace. Near Grassa, the main road to Carthage turned inland across the peninsula leading to Cape Bon. At this point, a skirmish between Byzantine and Vandal scouts prompted Belisarius to divide his forces. The army took the direct road to Carthage, while the naval commander, Calonymus, was instructed not to enter Carthage but to remain about 3 mi (4.8 km) offshore until summoned by Belisarius.

=== Battle of Ad Decimum ===
On 13 September, Gelimer confronted Belisarius at Ad Decimum. (Note: Ad Decimum (Latin for "at the tenth [mile post]"), was a marker along the Mediterranean coast road ten Roman miles (9.2 mi (14.8 km)) south of Carthage.) Gelimer had at his disposal possibly 10,000–12,000 men, which was insufficient to counter the Byzantines. Gelimer planned to ambush the Byzantines at the narrows of Ad Decimum. He ordered his brother Ammatus to execute the imprisoned royal family and march to Ad Decimum from the capital to block the path to Carthage while he would attack from the rear. He also dispatched his nephew Gibamundus with 2,000 men to reinforce his brother around the salt lake Sebkret es-Sedjoumi. Gelimer's plan was that when the Byzantines advanced through the narrows of Ad Decimum, they would find the path blocked by Gibamundus, who was ordered to attack them and push them back into the valley in disordered formation. Gelimer would then attack the Byzantines from the rear.

The plan failed; Ammatus arrived with a few soldiers about half a day earlier than the appointed time, leaving the bulk of his army behind to follow on. While scouting, Ammatus encountered Byzantine scouting forces and was killed in the ensuing fighting. His death triggered a Vandal rout, which spread to the reinforcements arriving in small groups. The Byzantine forces pursued the fleeing Vandals to the gates of Carthage. In another skirmish, Byzantine Hun mercenaries routed Vandal forces under Gibamundus at Pedion Halon (the Salt Marsh) about 40 stades from Ad Decimum. At this point Gelimer, with the main army, arrived and engaged with the Huns, who retreated. Although Gelimer had the advantage, he discovered the body of his brother Ammatus and stopped to mourn instead of pressing the attack. Belisarius was able to rally his fleeing cavalry and launch a counterattack, catching the Vandals in disorder. The Byzantines routed them, pursuing them until nightfall. The victory forced the Vandals to retreat toward the Plain of Bulla, leaving the road to Carthage open and the city was captured in the following days.

=== Battle of Tricamarum ===
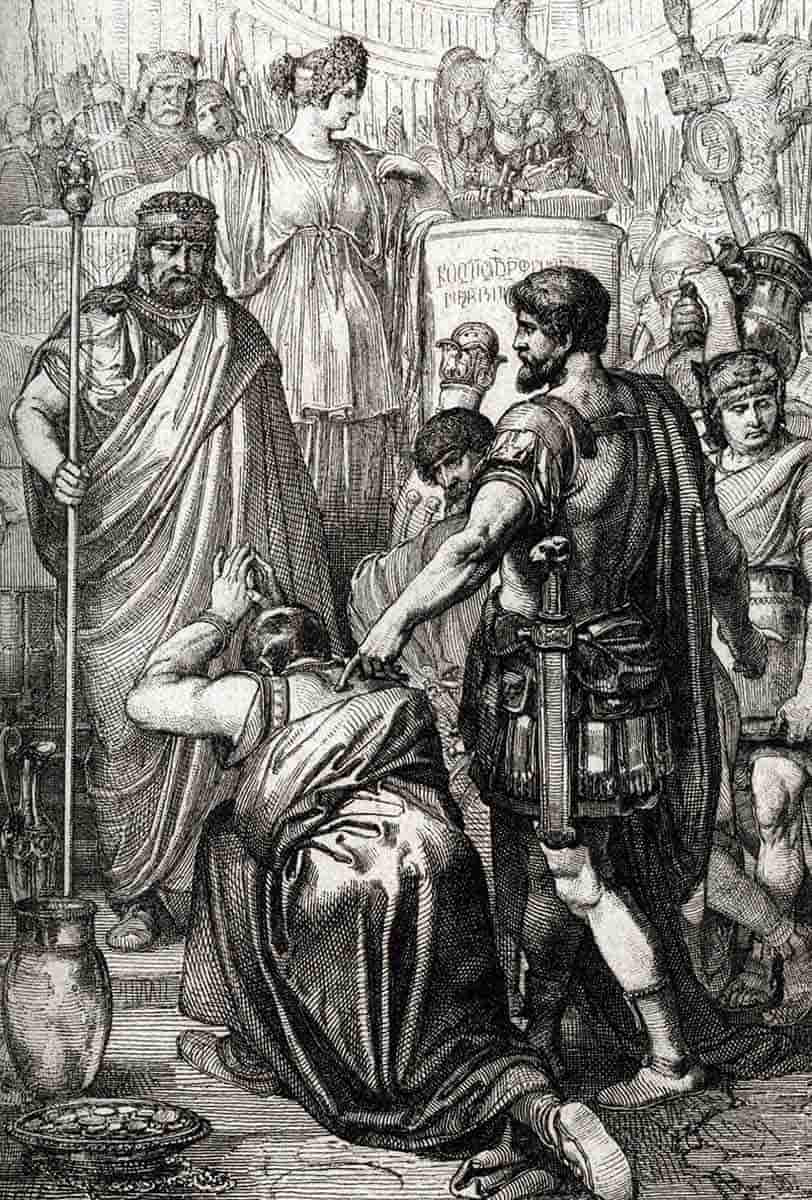
Belisarius presenting his Vandal captive, King Gelimer, to Emperor Justinian I (the wife of the emperor stands behind him), lithograph by Peter Johann Nepomuk Geiger (c. 1840)

Gelimer managed to escape and regrouped. While waiting for his brother to return from Sardinia, he offered rewards to the local Punic and Berber peoples for every Byzantine head they could bring. Gelimer sent agents to undermine the loyalty of the Carthaginian inhabitants and attempted to have the Byzantine Hun mercenaries betray Belisarius, achieving some success. The Huns feared that if the Byzantines won, they would remain in Libya instead of returning to their native lands and would not keep their booty. The Hunnic auxiliaries remained neutral, intending to support whichever side emerged victorious. On the return of Tzazon from Sardinia, the two armies combined early in December. Gelimer thought that his forces were strong enough (approximately 17,000) to take the offensive. With the two brothers at the head of the army, the Vandals marched towards Carthage, where the Byzantines were stationed. On its way, it destroyed the aqueduct that supplied the city with most of its water. They also tried to block food supplies by land but not by sea. The Vandals did not try to storm the city, and the Byzantines did not engage them outside the city walls.

Belisarius decided against letting the Vandals besiege the city and marched toward Gelimer's camp near Tricamarum about 20 mi (32 km) west of Carthage. On 15 December 533, the two armies engaged in the Battle of Tricamarum. The Byzantines were outnumbered but they were able to weaken the center with repeated feigned attacks with their horse archers before their final charge. At the height of the battle, Tzazon died, prompting the collapse of the center. At this point, the Huns joined the pursuit; Gelimer fled, triggering the collapse of the remaining Vandal army.

Gelimer retreated to Mons Pappua (possibly in the Mount Edough, near Annaba) on the border of Numidia, where he soon found himself besieged by Byzantine forces under Pharas. (Note: For possible location of Mons Pappua see J. Desanges, 1959. "La dernière retraite de Gélimer", Cahiers de Tunisie 7, pp. 429–35.) According to Procopius, when summoned to surrender, Gelimer instead asked Pharas to send him a loaf of bread, a sponge, and a lyre, to make the winter months on Pappua more bearable.

=== Aftermath ===
In March 534 AD, Gelimer, realizing that he had no chance of regaining his kingdom, surrendered to the Byzantines. He was then transferred to Constantinople and presented to Justinian. According to Procopius, on his abdication he cried out the verse from Ecclesiastes 1:2, "Vanity of vanities, all is vanity" during Belisarius's triumph in Constantinople. Gelimer refused to abjure his Arian faith, and, as a result, he did not gain the patrikius title. Justinian provided estates for him and his supporters in Galatia where he lived until the end of his life. The year of his death is unknown.

== See also ==
Regnal titles
Preceded by Hilderic	King of the Vandals; 15 June 530 – March 534	Conquest by the Byzantine Empire
