= Calonymus =

Calonymus of Alexandria (Medieval Greek: Καλώνυμος 'Αλεξανδρεύς) was a native Egyptian naval commander, known for leading the fleet in the Vandalic War (533–534). The main source about him is Procopius.

== Biography ==
Calonymus was probably a native of Alexandria, capital of the Diocese of Egypt. In 533, he was assigned as the sole commander of the Byzantine navy during the Vandalic War. Its mission was to transport the troops of Belisarius to the Vandal Kingdom of North Africa. Procopius reports in detail the naval force assembled: "And for the whole force five hundred ships were required, no one of which was able to carry more than fifty thousand medimni, nor any one less than three thousand. And in all the vessels together there were thirty thousand sailors, Egyptians and Ionians for the most part, and Cilicians, and one commander was appointed over all the ships, Calonymus of Alexandria. And they had also ships of war prepared as for sea-fighting, to the number of ninety-two, and they were single-banked ships covered by decks, in order that the men rowing them might if possible not be exposed to the bolts of the enemy. Such boats are called "dromones" by those of the present time; for they are able to attain a great speed. In these sailed two thousand men of Byzantium, who were all rowers as well as fighting men; for there was not a single superfluous man among them."

While this passage fails to give him a specific title, a later one calls him navarch ("leader of the ships", admiral). Said passage reads: "As we proceeded from there it was impossible to discern the ships. For high rocks extending well into the sea cause mariners to make a great circuit, and there is a projecting headland, inside of which lies the town of Hermes. Belisarius therefore commanded Archelaus, the prefect, and Calonymus, the admiral, not to put in at Carthage, but to remain about two hundred stades away until he himself should summon them. And departing from Grasse we came on the fourth day to Decimum, seventy stades distant from Carthage."

During the fall of Carthage, capital of the Vandal Kingdom, Calonymus reportedly looted the properties of the local merchants. He thus violated a standing order by Belisarius. Procopius narrates "Belisarius prevented the entrance [of soldiers] in order to guard against any ambuscade being set for his men by the enemy, and also to prevent the soldiers from having freedom to turn to plundering, as they might under the concealment of night. On that day, since an east wind arose for them, the ships reached the headland, and the Carthaginians, for they already sighted them, removed the defensive iron chains of the harbour which they call Mandracium, and made it possible for the fleet to enter. ... There they arrived about dusk and all anchored, except, indeed, that Calonymus with some of the sailors, disregarding the general and all the others, went off secretly to Mandracium, no one daring to hinder him, and plundered the property of the merchants dwelling on the sea, both foreigners and Carthaginians."

Calonymus testified to his own innocence under oath and was set free. Procopius asserts that Calonymus was actually guilty and got to keep whatever he had stolen. He returned safely to Constantinople, dying there of an apoplectic seizure. Procopius narrates: "On the following day Belisarius commanded those on the ships to disembark, and after marshalling the whole army and drawing it up in battle formation, he marched into Carthage; for he feared lest he should encounter some snare set by the enemy. There he reminded the soldiers at length of how much good fortune had come to them because they had displayed moderation toward the Libyans, and he exhorted them earnestly to preserve good order with the greatest care in Carthage. For all the Libyans had been Romans in earlier times and had come under the Vandals by no will of their own and had suffered many outrages at the hands of these barbarians. For this very reason the emperor had entered into war with the Vandals, and it was not holy that any harm should come from them to the people whose freedom they had made the ground for taking the field against the Vandals. ... And Belisarius bound Calonymus by oaths to bring without fail all his thefts to the light. And Calonymus, taking the oath and disregarding what he had sworn, for the moment made the money his plunder, but not long afterwards he paid his just penalty in Byzantium. For being taken with the disease called apoplexy, he became insane and bit off his own tongue and then died. But this happened at a later time.

== Sources ==
- Martindale, John R., ed. (1992). The Prosopography of the Later Roman Empire: Volume III, AD 527–641. Cambridge: Cambridge University Press. ISBN 0-521-20160-8.
- Procopius of Caesarea; Dewing, Henry Bronson (1914), History of the wars. vol. 2, Books III-IV, Cambridge University Press, ISBN 0-674-99054-4
