= Tzazo =

Vandal noble (died 533)

Tzazo (also known as Tzazon or Zano) was the brother to King Gelimer (530–534), the last Vandal ruler of North Africa. Tzazo died on 15 December 533 during the Battle of Tricamarum, which finally brought to an end the Vandal Kingdom in North Africa.

Tzazo had not been involved in the earlier Battle of Ad Decimum because Godas, likely instigated by the Byzantine Emperor Justinian, had declared the Vandal province on the island of Sardinia independent from Carthage. King Gelimer was unaware that the Byzantines were planning an invasion and sent Tzazo to repress the rebellion, which he did.

After his defeat at Ad Decimum, Gelimer recalled the victorious Tzazo, Tzazo and his expeditionary force of 5,000 Vandals Gelimer went on the offensive. Their joined forces marched on Carthage, damaging the city's aqueduct. Belisarius had spent the weeks since the Battle of Ad Decimum strengthening the city defences; he did not want to face a siege and he was beginning to grow suspicious of the loyalty of the Huns and other barbarians under his command, knowing some of his army was being approached by agents of Gelimer.

The Battle of Tricamarum took place on December 15, 533 between the armies of the Vandals, commanded by King Gelimer and his brother Tzazo, and the Byzantines commanded by Belisarius. The two forces met some 30 miles outside Carthage and the Roman cavalry immediately charged the Vandal lines, reforming and attacking two more times. In the third charge, the Vandalic lines broke, with Tzazo cutting down 20 Byzantine soldiers before he himself was slain. Gelimer's forces, who were ill-prepared for the sudden attack by Belisarius, only reached the battlefield several hours after the fighting had ended. Finding his slain brother, Gelimer lost heart and fled to the mountains of Numidia, where he sought refuge with the Berber tribes in the area. Gelimer, motivated by hunger and desperation, eventually gave himself up to the Emperor.
