= Battle of Tricamarum =

Battle during Justinian's Vandalic War

- Part of the Vandalic War
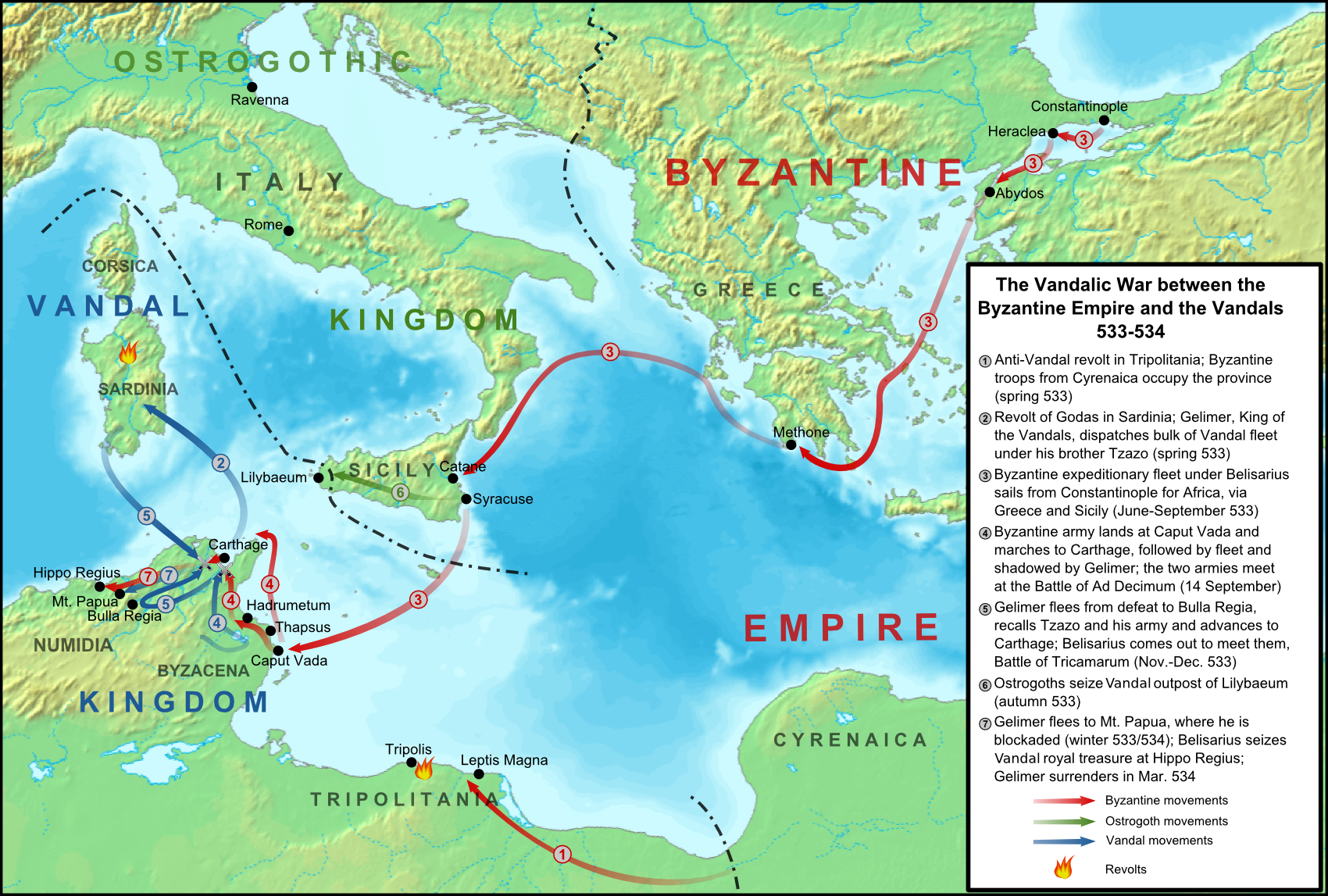
- A map of the Vandalic War 533–534
Date	15 December 533
Location	Near Carthage
Result	Byzantine victory; Dissolution of the Vandal Kingdom
Territorial changes	Byzantine conquest of North Africa

Belligerents
Byzantine Empire	Vandal Kingdom

Commanders and leaders
Belisarius; John the Armenian	Gelimer; Tzazo †

Strength
8,000–11,000	15,000–20,000

Casualties and losses
50	800

The Battle of Tricamarum took place on 15 December 533 between the armies of the Byzantine Empire, under Belisarius, and the Vandal Kingdom, commanded by King Gelimer and his brother Tzazo.

Following the Byzantine victory at the Battle of Ad Decimum in September 533, Belisarius captured Carthage and prepared to face the remaining Vandal forces led by King Gelimer. Gelimer reunited with his brother Tzazo and attempted to weaken the Byzantines by encouraging the Hunnic mercenaries of Belisarius to change sides and by disrupting Carthage's water and food supplies. Instead of waiting for a siege, Belisarius marched to Tricamarum, 17 miles (27 km) west of Carthage, where the Vandals had encamped. Belisarius began the battle with cavalry attacks led by John the Armenian, and although the first assaults were repelled, a larger third attack broke the Vandal center. Tzazo was killed, causing Gelimer to flee along with the rest of the Vandal forces. The Byzantine pursuit ended when they secured the Vandal camp, where the soldiers lost discipline and plundered it. Order was restored the following day, and Belisarius pursued Gelimer, who eventually surrendered after fleeing into the mountains. The victory ended the Vandal Kingdom, with the Byzantines claiming control over North Africa, providing Emperor Justinian I with a base for campaigns to reclaim parts of the former Western Roman Empire.

== Primary sources ==
The Battle of Tricamarum is described in the Wars by Procopius of Caesarea, who is a Greek historian of Late Antiquity and the main source for Justinian I's reign. In Books III–IV of the Wars, Procopius described the Vandalic War, and it is largely paraphrased by modern scholars as it is the sole source that covered these events. He was Belisarius's assessor, being a witness to military engagements, having access to official information and knowledge of military affairs. These advantages placed him in a unique position to reconstruct the wars in the East, Africa, and Italy. Procopius adopted a classical style in narrating the events, inspired by historians such as Thucydides and Herodotus, emphasizing moral explanation through dramatic speeches over strict documentary accuracy.

Procopius's work is largely factual, and even though he was on the Byzantine side, it is neither entirely neutral nor propaganda. He portrayed Belisarius favorably compared to other Byzantine commanders, reflecting loyalty and disproportionately emphasizing mounted combat, thereby marginalizing the role of infantry in battles and sieges. His view of Justinian ranges from enthusiasm and optimism in the first part of the Wars to hostility in the Secret History. In the Secret History, Procopius presents history as a moral struggle in which effective rulers maintain order, criticizing Justinian not for his imperial ambitions but for the disorder and instability his actions allegedly caused.

== Prelude ==
After the Byzantine victory at the Battle of Ad Decimum on 13 September 533, Belisarius and his army captured Carthage. The Vandal king Gelimer, along with his remaining forces, set up at Bulla Regia in Numidia, about 150 km (90 mi) to the west of Carthage (at what is now the western border of modern Tunisia). He knew that in his current state, he would not be able to face Belisarius and sent messengers to his brother Tzazo, who was then campaigning in Sardinia, where he had restored Vandal rule. When he received the message, Tzazo set about returning to Africa to join Gelimer. The Vandal king offered rewards to the local Punic and Berber peoples for every Byzantine head they could bring. Gelimer sent agents to undermine the loyalty of the Carthaginian inhabitants and attempted to have the Byzantine Hun mercenaries—that had played a key role in the success at Ad Decimum—betray Belisarius, achieving some success. The Huns feared that if the Byzantines won, they would remain in Libya instead of returning to their native lands and would also not keep their booty. The Hunnic auxiliaries remained neutral, intending to support whichever side emerged victorious.

Tzazo and his army joined Gelimer early in December, and Gelimer thought that his forces were strong enough to take the offensive. With the two brothers at the head of the army, the Vandals marched towards Carthage. On its way, they destroyed the aqueduct that supplied the city with most of its water. They also tried to block food supplies by land but not by sea. The Vandals did not try to storm the city.

Belisarius did not engage the Vandals outside the city walls because the repairs to the fortifications were not complete. He was also aware of Gelimer's agents and could no longer trust the Huns in his forces. Instead of waiting for possible treachery during a siege, in mid-December 533, Belisarius decided to force a decisive battle. He formed up his army and marched toward Gelimer, who had established his camp at Tricamarum, about 150 stades (Note: Approximately 17 miles (27 km).) west of Carthage, on the banks of the Medjerda River. Gelimer had collected at the camp not only his army but also the wives, children, and property of his men. Belisarius sent John the Armenian ahead with the majority of the cavalry, while he followed with the infantry and a 500-strong mounted reserve. John established a camp opposite the Vandals at Tricamarum and waited for the main army.

== Deployment and battle ==
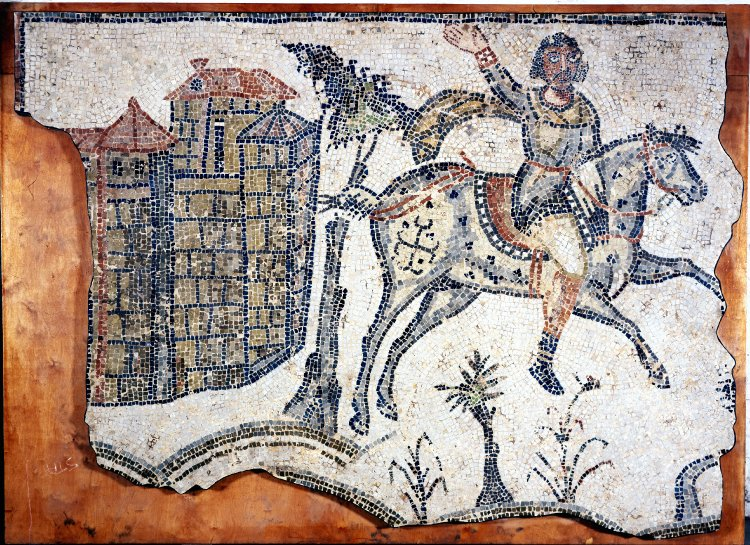
Vandal cavalryman, c. 500, from a mosaic pavement at Bordj Djedid near Carthage

On 15 December 533, the Byzantines entered the battle with high morale, despite the Hunnic auxiliaries' remaining reluctant to fight and planning to support whichever side prevailed. The Vandals still outnumbered the Byzantines but had declined in discipline and effectiveness after years of prosperity in Africa. Their reliance on swords and spears left them at a disadvantage against Belisarius's mobile mounted archers. Gelimer deployed his cavalry behind a small stream, placing his brother Tzazo and his elite troops (approximately 5,000 men) in the center, with Moorish allies in reserve and Vandal cavalry units of chiliarches (a unit of 1,000 men) on the flanks. The historian Ilkka Syvänne estimates the size of the Vandal force at about 15,000–20,000 men, plus the Moors. Belisarius formed his cavalry (8,000–11,000 men) opposite them while leaving his infantry behind, about one day's march. He was at the center with a reserve force, while the Huns stayed on the flanks, waiting to see how the battle unfolded.

Initially, no side was willing to take the initiative. Belisarius opened the battle with a series of probing cavalry attacks led by John. In the first two attempts, Tzazo's men repelled the assaults, driving John and his men to the river, where they regrouped at the Byzantine camp. The Vandals did not cross the stream, remaining in their original position. In each attack, more Byzantine troops were used. In the third attempt, nearly all the cavalry forces at the center advanced and engaged in close combat. Several Vandal nobles and Tzazo were killed, causing the Vandal line to collapse. At this point, the Huns joined the pursuit. Gelimer fled, triggering the collapse of the remaining Vandal army. The Byzantine pursuit halted outside the Vandal camp, where they waited for their infantry to arrive later that afternoon. Byzantine casualties were minimal, fewer than 50, while the Vandals suffered losses of about 800 men.

The Byzantines stormed the camp but quickly abandoned discipline in pursuit of plunder. Belisarius spent the following day restoring order before sending John with 200 cavalry to pursue Gelimer. He also accepted the surrender of Vandals who had taken refuge in local churches, disarmed them, and escorted them, along with the captured treasure, back to Carthage. Once discipline had been restored, Belisarius resumed the pursuit with his main army.

== Aftermath ==
Belisarius marched on the city of Hippo Regius, which opened its gates to him, and the royal treasures of the Vandals were captured. Gelimer realized that he had lost the support of Vandal nobles, following the two defeats (Ad Decimum and Tricamarum), and attempted to flee to Spain. The Byzantines heard of his plans and intercepted him. He was forced to abandon his belongings and take refuge in the mountains of Tunis with the Moors. He was found and surrounded by Byzantine forces led by Pharas the Herulian. At first, he refused to surrender, even after promises that he would be allowed to rule. After a heavy winter, he eventually gave up and surrendered to Belisarius. The Vandal Kingdom ended, and its provinces in Sardinia, Corsica, and the Balearic Islands came under the control of Justinian as part of the Byzantine North Africa. Gelimer was transported to Constantinople, along with captured treasures, to witness the triumph of Belisarius. According to Procopius, the Vandal king once witnessed Justinian in the hippodrome during the triumph; he repeated to himself, "Vanities of vanities, all vanities". The historian Paul K. Davis argues that with this victory, the Byzantines restored control over North Africa, which then served as the launching point for their invasion of the Italian Peninsula. Its success temporarily reunited much of the former Eastern and Western Roman Empires under one imperial authority.
