= Chebba =

Chebba الشابة
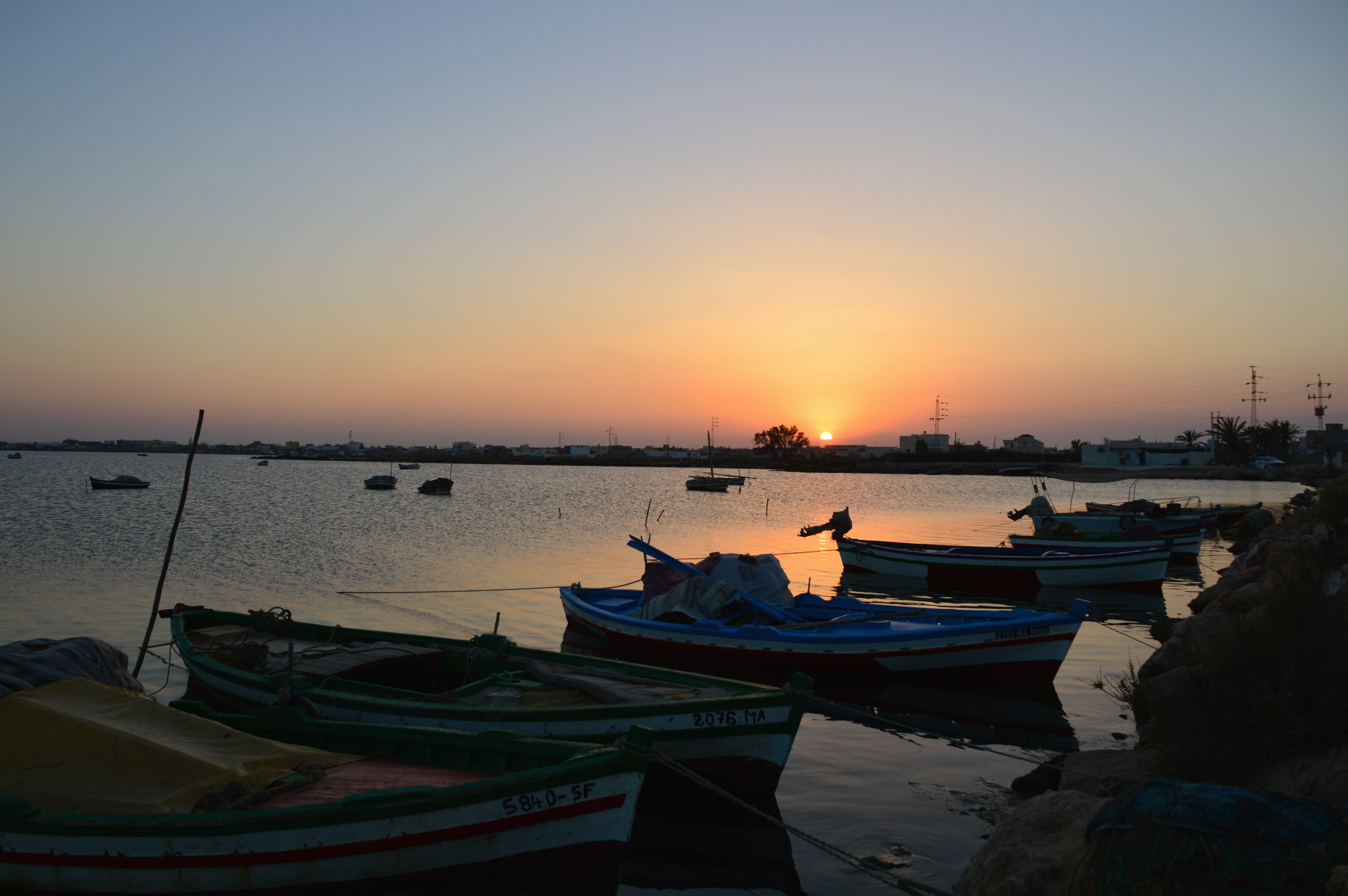

- Location in Tunisia
- Coordinates: 35°14′14″N 11°06′54″E
- Country: Tunisia
- Governorate: Mahdia Governorate

Population (2014)
  - Total: 22,227
- Time zone: UTC1 (CET)

Chebba (La Chebba, Ash Shabbah, aš-Šābbah, Sheba) is a small city in the Mahdia Governorate of Tunisia in North Africa on the coast of the Mediterranean Sea.

== History ==
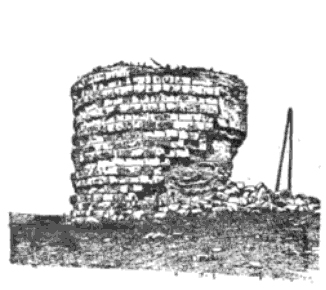
Ruined tower of Bordj Khadidja at Ras Kaboudia.

The city of Chebba derives its name from the headland 3 kilometres (1.9 mi) to the east, which was classically known as Caput Vada (headland above the shoals).

The Byzantine general Belisarius landed here in 533 and went on to inflict a devastating defeat on the Vandals. The town of Chebba was founded by Justinian about 534 CE after the defeat of the Vandals, and named Justinianopolis.

The headland (Caput Vada) is now known as Ras Kaboudia and is site of the ruins of the bordj (harbor fortress) of Bordj Khadidja, which was built upon Byzantine foundations. The fortress guarded the harbor entrance and was one of a chain of similar forts built by the Abbasids along the coast of North Africa in the 8th century. It was later renamed after Khadija Ben Kalthoum, a poet of the eleventh century, who was born in Chebba.
