= Dromon =

Type of warship of the Byzantine navy

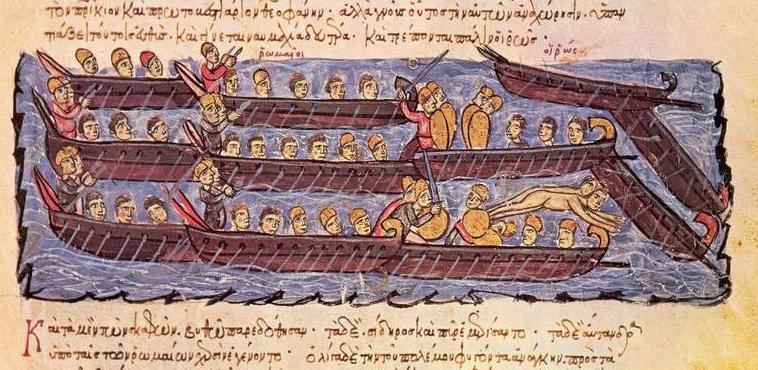
Illustration from the Madrid Skylitzes showing the Byzantine fleet repelling the Rus' attack on Constantinople in 941, and the use of the spurs to smash the oars of the Rus' vessels. Boarding actions and hand-to-hand fighting determined the outcome of most naval battles in the Middle Ages.

The dromon (from Greek δρόμων, dromōn, lit. 'runner'), a type of galley, became the most important type of warship of the Byzantine navy from the 5th to 12th centuries AD, after which the Italian-style galley superseded it. It developed from the ancient liburnian, which was the mainstay of the Roman navy during classical antiquity.

The Middle English word dromond and the Old French word dromont derive from the Greek word; these names identified any particularly large medieval ship.

== Evolution and features ==
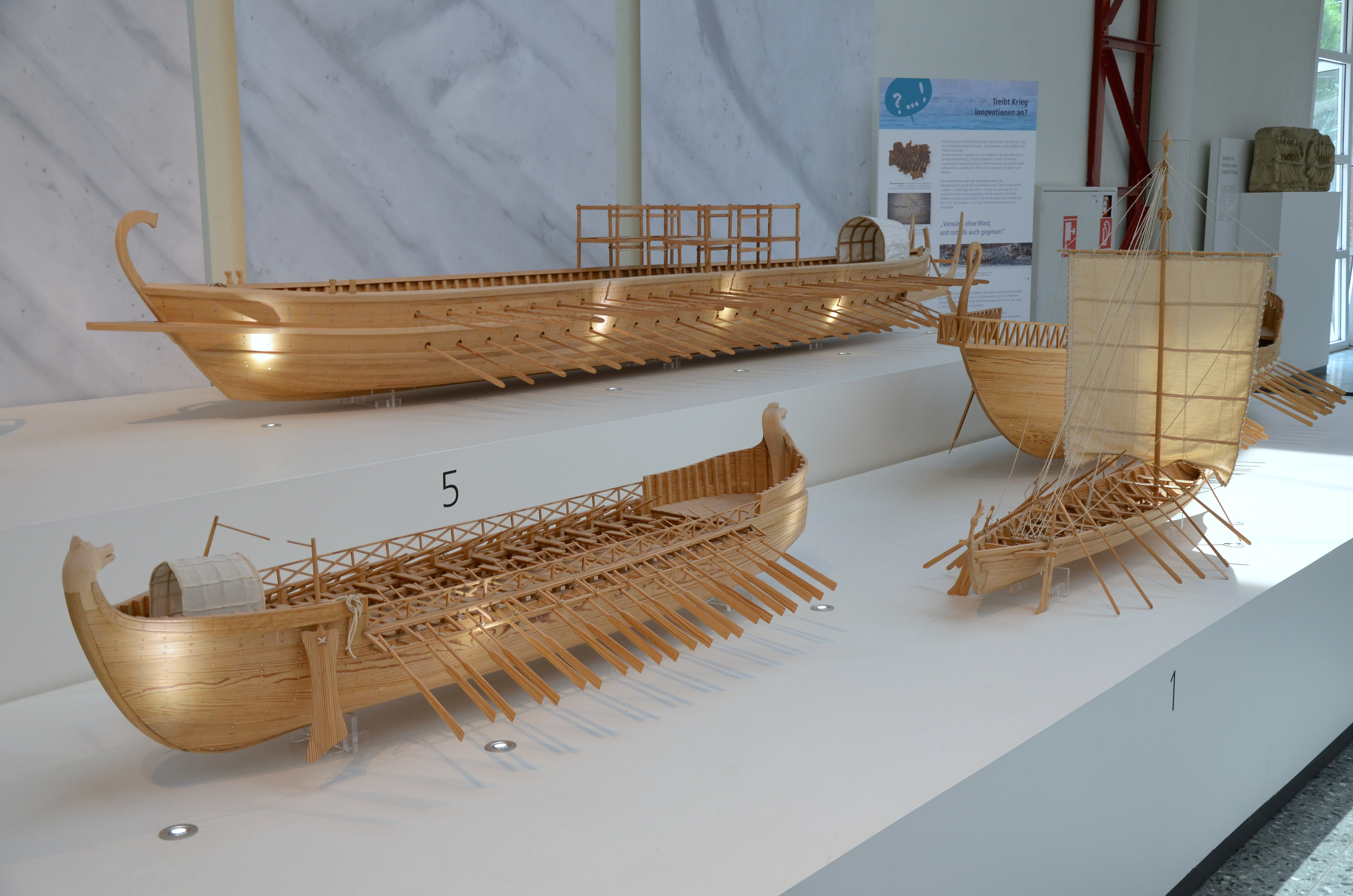
Reconstruction (top) in 1:10 scale of a bireme dromon's hull, at the Museum of Ancient Seafaring, Mainz

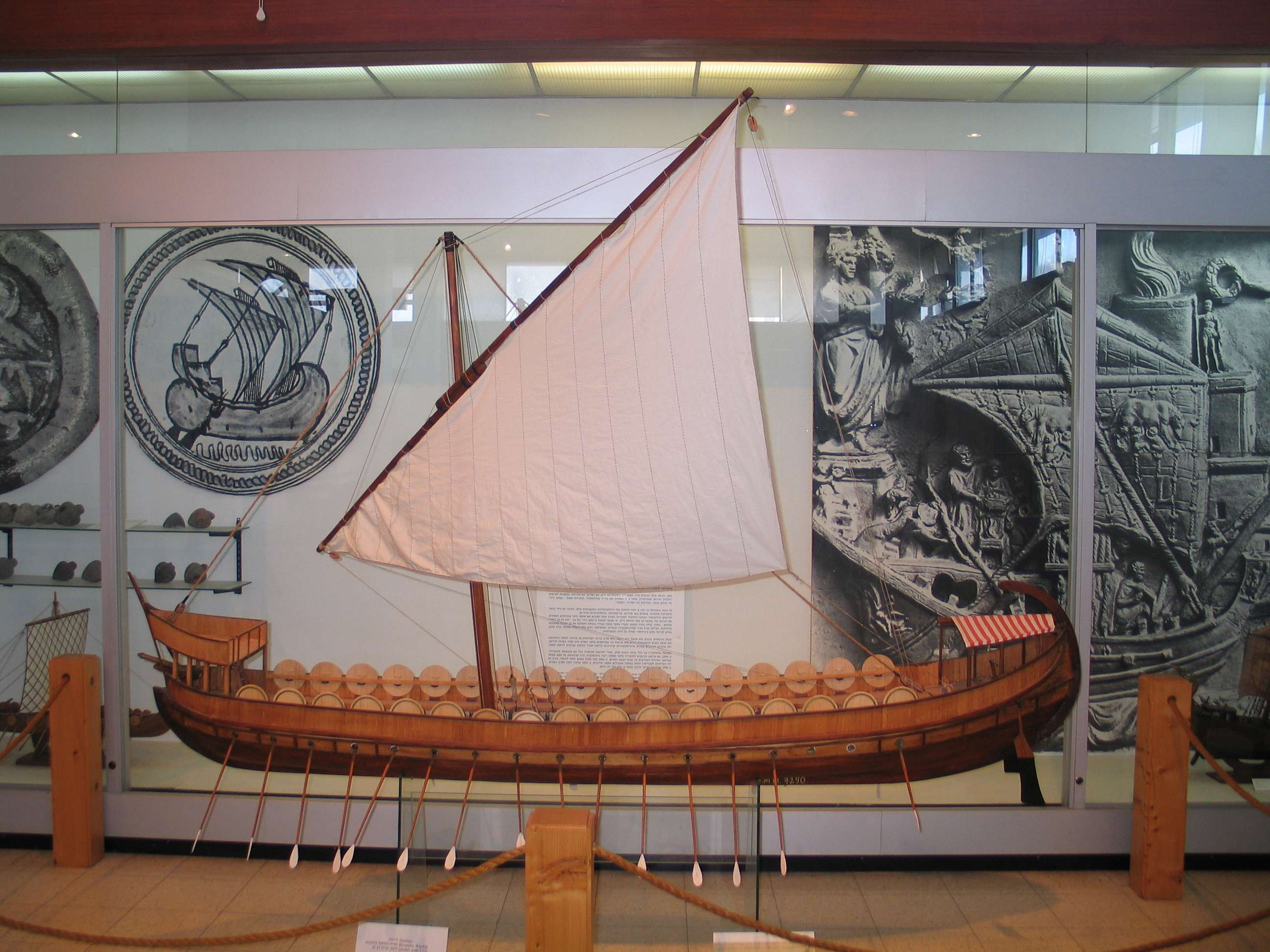
Reconstruction of a monoreme dromon at the Israeli National Maritime Museum, Haifa

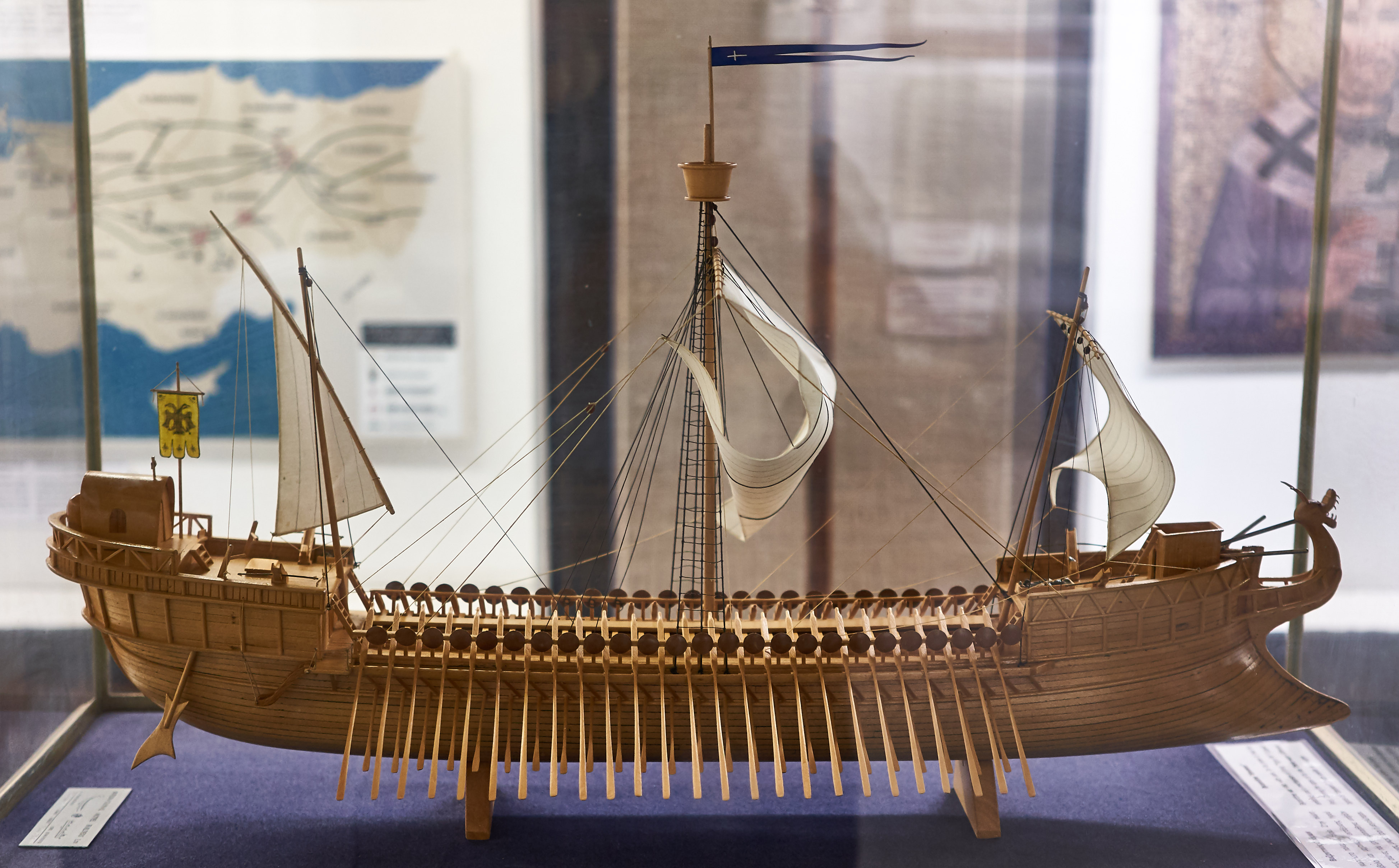
Model of a Byzantine warship with oars, located Athens War Museum

The appearance and evolution of medieval warships is a matter of debate and conjecture; until recently, no remains of an oared warship from either ancient or early medieval times had been found and information had to be gathered by analyzing literary evidence, crude artistic depictions and the remains of a few merchant vessels (such as the 7th-century Pantano Longarini wreck from Sicily, the 7th-century Yassi Ada ship and the 11th-century Serçe Limanı wreck). Only in 2005–2006 did archaeological digs for the Marmaray project in the Harbor of Theodosius (modern Yenikapi) uncover the remains of over 36 Byzantine ships from the 6th to 10th centuries, including four light galleys of the galea type.

The accepted view is that the main developments which differentiated the early dromons from the liburnians and that henceforth characterized Mediterranean galleys, were the adoption of a full deck (katastrōma), the abandonment of the rams on the bow in favor of an above-water spur and the gradual introduction of lateen sails. Authors have suggested that the latter was introduced into the Mediterranean by Arabs, possibly with an ultimate origin in India. The discovery of new depictions and literary references in recent decades has led scholars to antedate the appearance of the lateen sail in the Levant to the late Hellenistic or early Roman period. Not only the triangular, but also the quadrilateral version were known, used for centuries (mostly on smaller craft) in parallel with square sails.

The reasons for the abandonment of the ram (Latin: rostrum, Greek: ἔμβολος) are unclear. Depictions of upward-pointing beaks in the 4th-century Vatican Vergil manuscript may well illustrate that the ram had already been replaced by a spur in late-Roman galleys. Byzantinists John Pryor and Elizabeth Jeffreys argue that the purpose of the spur was to allow the dromon to ride up on an enemy's oars and crush them, destroying its propulsion, and point out that one of the medieval Latin terms for spur, "calcar", is derived from the verb "to trample". One possibility is that the change occurred because of the gradual evolution of the ancient shell-first mortise and tenon hull construction method, against which rams had been designed, into the skeleton-first method, which produced a stronger and more flexible hull, less susceptible to ramming. By the early 7th century, the ram's original function had been forgotten, if we judge by Isidore of Seville's comments that they were used to protect against collision with underwater rocks.

Belisarius's fleet during the Vandalic War, as described by Procopius of Caesarea, was apparently at least partly fitted with lateen sails, making it probable that by that time the lateen had become the standard rig for the dromon, with the traditional square sail gradually falling from use in medieval navigation. These 6th-century dromons were single-banked ('monoreme') ships of probably 50 oars, arranged with 25 oars on each side. Again unlike Hellenistic vessels, which used an outrigger, these extended directly from the hull. In the later two-banked ('bireme') dromons of the 9th and 10th centuries, the two oar banks (elasiai) were divided by the deck, with the first oar bank below and the second oar bank above deck; these rowers were expected to fight with the ship's marines in boarding operations. The historian Christos Makrypoulias suggests an arrangement of 25 oarsmen beneath and 35 on the deck on either side for a dromon of 120 rowers. The length of these ships was probably about 32 meters. Most contemporary vessels had a single mast (histos or katartion), the larger bireme dromons probably needed at least two masts to maneuver, assuming that a lateen sail for a ship this size would have reached unmanageable dimensions. The ship was steered by means of two quarter rudders at the stern (prymnē), which also housed a tent (skēnē) that covered the captain's berth (krab[b]at[t]os). The prow (prōra) featured an elevated forecastle (pseudopation), below which the siphon for the discharge of Greek fire projected; secondary siphons could also be carried amidships on either side. A pavesade (kastellōma), on which marines could hang their shields, ran around the sides of the ship, providing protection to the deck crew. Larger ships also had wooden castles (xylokastra) on either side between the masts, similar to those attested for the Roman liburnians, providing archers with elevated firing platforms. The bow spur (peronion) was intended to ride over an enemy ship's oars, breaking them and rendering it helpless against missile fire and boarding.

The four galeai ships uncovered in the Yenikapi excavations, dating to the 10th–11th centuries, are of uniform design and construction, suggesting centralized manufacturing. They have a length of about 30 metres (98 ft), and are built of European Black Pine and Oriental plane.

== Variants ==
By the 10th century, there were three main classes of bireme warships of the general dromon type, as detailed in the inventories for the expeditions sent against the Emirate of Crete in 911 and 949: the [chelandion] ousiakon ([χελάνδιον] οὑσιακόν), so named because it was manned by an ousia of 108 men; the [chelandion] pamphylon ([χελάνδιον] πάμφυλον), crewed with up to 120–160 men, its name either implying an origin in the region of Pamphylia as a transport ship or its crewing with "picked crews" (from πᾶν+φῦλον, 'all tribes'); and the dromōn proper, crewed by two ousiai. In Constantine VII's De Ceremoniis, the heavy dromōn is said to have an even larger crew of 230 rowers and 70 marines; the naval expert John H. Pryor considers them as supernumerary crews being carried aboard, while Makrypoulias suggests that the extra men correspond to a second rower on each of the upper-bank oars. A smaller, single-bank ship, the monērēs (μονήρης, 'single-banked') or galea (γαλέα, from which the term "galley" derives), with c. 60 men as crew, was used for scouting missions but also in the wings of the battle line.

Three-banked ('trireme') dromons are described in a 10th-century work dedicated to the parakoimōmenos Basil Lekapenos. However, this treatise, which survives only in fragments, draws heavily upon references on the appearance and construction of a classical Greek trireme, and must therefore be used with care when trying to apply it to the warships of the middle Byzantine period. The existence of trireme vessels is, however, attested in the Fatimid navy in the 11th and 12th centuries, and references made by Leo VI to large Arab ships in the 10th century may also indicate trireme galleys.

For cargo transport, the Byzantines usually commandeered ordinary merchantmen as transport ships (phortēgoi) or supply ships (skeuophora). These appear to have been mostly sailing vessels, rather than oared. The Byzantines and Arabs also employed horse-transports (hippagōga), which were either sailing ships or galleys, the latter certainly modified to accommodate the horses. Given that the chelandia appear originally to have been oared horse-transports, this would imply differences in construction between the chelandion and the dromōn proper, terms which otherwise are often used indiscriminately in literary sources. While the dromōn was developed exclusively as a war galley, the chelandion would have had to have a special compartment amidships to accommodate a row of horses, increasing its beam and hold depth.

== General and cited sources ==
- Ahrweiler, Hélène (1966), Byzance et la mer. La Marine de Guerre, la politique et les institutions maritimes de Byzance aux VIIe–XVe siècles (in French), Paris: Presses Universitaires de France, ISSN 0520-0121
- Basch, Lucien (2001), "La voile latine, son origine, son évolution et ses parentés arabes", in Tzalas, H. (ed.), Tropis VI, 6th International Symposium on Ship Construction in Antiquity, Lamia 1996 proceedings (in French), Athens: Hellenic Institute for the Preservation of Nautical Tradition, pp. 55–85
- Campbell, I.C. (1995), "The Lateen Sail in World History" (PDF), Journal of World History, 6 (1): 1–23, archived from the original (PDF) on 2016-08-04
- Casson, Lionel (1995), Ships and Seamanship in the Ancient World, Johns Hopkins University Press, ISBN 0-8018-5130-0
- Christides, Vassilios (1995), "Byzantine Dromon and Arab Shini: The Development of the Average Byzantine and Arab Warships and the Problem of the Number and Function of the Oarsmen", Tropis III, 3rd International Symposium on Ship Construction in Antiquity, Athens 1989 proceedings (PDF), Hellenic Institute for the Preservation of Nautical Tradition, pp. 111–122, archived from the original (PDF) on 2012-03-06
- Delgado, James P (2011), "Ships on Land", in Catsambis, Alexis; Ford, Ben; Hamilton, Donny L. (eds.), The Oxford Handbook of Maritime Archaeology, Oxford University Press, pp. 182–191, ISBN 978-0-19-537517-6
- Dolley, R. H. (1948), "The Warships of the Later Roman Empire", The Journal of Roman Studies, 38, Society for the Promotion of Roman Studies: 47–53, doi:10.2307/298170, JSTOR 298170, S2CID 162710370
- Haldon, John (1999). Warfare, State and Society in the Byzantine World, 565–1204. London: UCL Press. ISBN 1-85728-495-X.
- Makrypoulias, Christos G. (1995), "The Navy in the Works of Constantine Porphyrogenitus", Graeco-Arabica (6), Athens: 152–171
- Pomey, Patrice (2006), "The Kelenderis Ship: A Lateen Sail", The International Journal of Nautical Archaeology, 35 (2): 326–329, Bibcode:2006IJNAr..35..326P, doi:10.1111/j.1095-9270.2006.00111.x, S2CID 162300888
- Pryor, John H. (2003), "Byzantium and the Sea: Byzantine Fleets and the History of the Empire in the Age of the Macedonian Emperors, c. 900–1025 CE", in Hattendorf, John B.; Unger, Richard W. (eds.), War at Sea in the Middle Ages and the Renaissance, Boydell Press, pp. 83–104, ISBN 0-85115-903-6
- Pryor, John H. (1995). "From Dromōn to Galea: Mediterranean Bireme Galleys AD 500–1300". In Morrison, John S.; Gardiner, Robert (eds.). The Age of the Galley: Mediterranean Oared Vessels Since Pre-Classical Times. London: Conway Maritime Press. pp. 101–116. ISBN 0-85177-554-3.
- Pryor, John H.; Jeffreys, Elizabeth M. (2006), The Age of the ΔΡΟΜΩΝ: The Byzantine Navy ca. 500–1204, Brill Academic Publishers, ISBN 978-90-04-15197-0
