= Numidia (Roman province) =

Roman province on the North African coast

Coordinates: 36°N 6.5°E

Numidia Numidiae (Latin)
- Province of the Roman Empire
- 46 BC-AD 435; AD 534–AD 8th century
- Capital: Cirta (Constantine)
- Demonym: Numidian
- Historical era: Antiquity
  - Roman Annexation of Numidia: c. 46 BC
  - Conquered by Vandals: c. AD 435
  - Byzantine reconquest by Vandalic War: c. AD 534
  - Reorganization into the Exarchate: c. AD 591
  - Conquered by Arabs: c. AD 8th century
Preceded by	Succeeded by
Numidia	Vandal Kingdom; Ifriqiya
- Today part of: northeastern Algeria

Numidia was a Roman province on the North African coast, comprising roughly the territory of northeastern Algeria.

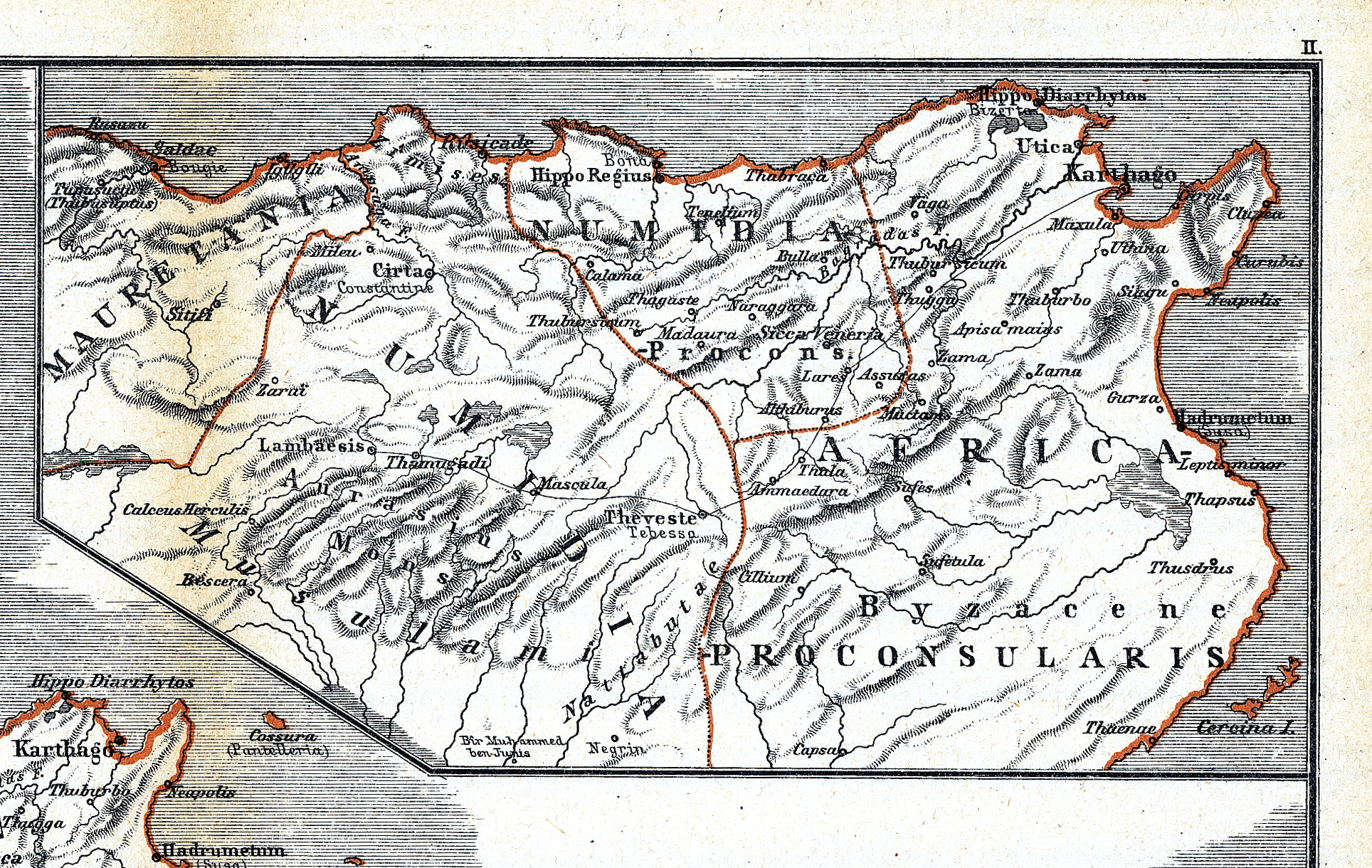
Map of Roman Numidia, according to Mommsen

== History ==
The people of the area were first identified as Numidians by Polybius around the 2nd century BC, although they were often referred to as the Nodidians.

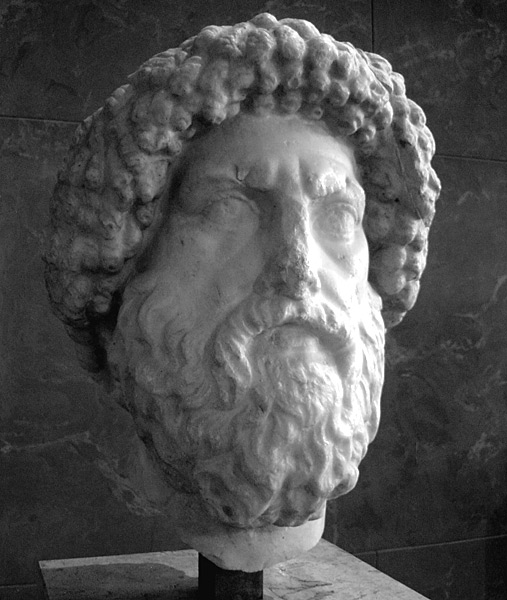
Roman marble bust of Juba I from Cherchell, Algeria. Louvre Museum

Eastern Numidia was annexed in 46 BC to create a new Roman province, Africa Nova. Western Numidia was also annexed as part of the province Africa Nova after the death of its last king, Arabio, in 40 BC, and subsequently the province (except Western Numidia) was united with province Africa Vetus by Emperor Augustus in 25 BC, to create the new province Africa Proconsularis. During the brief period (30–25 BC) Juba II (son of Juba I) ruled as a client king of Numidia on the territory of former province Africa Nova. In AD 40, the western portion of Africa Proconsularis, including its legionary garrison, was placed under an imperial legatus, and in effect became a separate province of Numidia, though the legatus of Numidia remained nominally subordinate to the proconsul of Africa until AD 203.

Christianity spread from the 2nd century onward. During the second century, the province was Christianized, but in the fourth century, it adhered to the Donatist heresy, despite giving rise to such figures of Orthodox faith as illustrious as Saint Augustine, bishop of Hippo Regius (Annaba, Algeria).

After 193, under Septimius Severus, Numidia was officially detached from the province of Africa and constituted a province in its own right, governed by an imperial legatus pro praetore. Under Diocletian, it constituted a simple province in the tetrarchic reorganization, then was divided in two: Numidia Cirtensis, with capital at Cirta, and Numidia Militiana ("Military Numidia"), with capital at the legionary base of Lambaesis. However, after decades, Emperor Constantine the Great reunited the two provinces in a single one, administered from Cirta, which was now renamed Constantina (modern Constantine).

In 428, the Vandals began their incursions in the African provinces. They eventually managed to create the Vandal Kingdom that lasted between 432 and 534, the year in which the Vandals fell and the African provinces was reincorporated into (Eastern) Roman domain and formed the Praetorian prefecture of Africa, half a century later the Exarchate of Africa, by the reign of Maurice (r. 582–602).

Between 696 and 708, the region was conquered again, this time by the Arab Muslims (Umayyad), and became part of Ifriqiya.

== Major cities ==
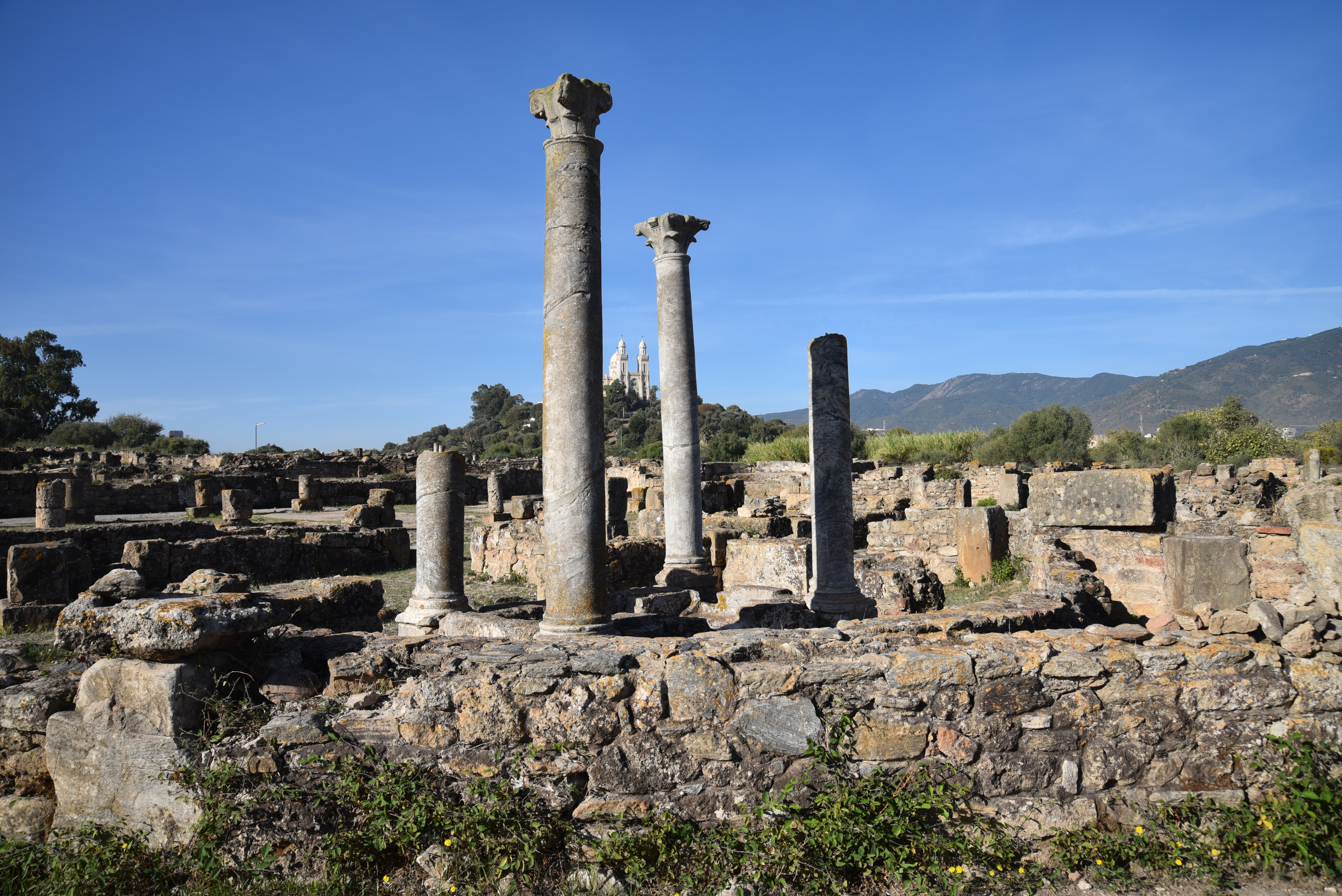
Ruins of the Roman city of Hippo Regius

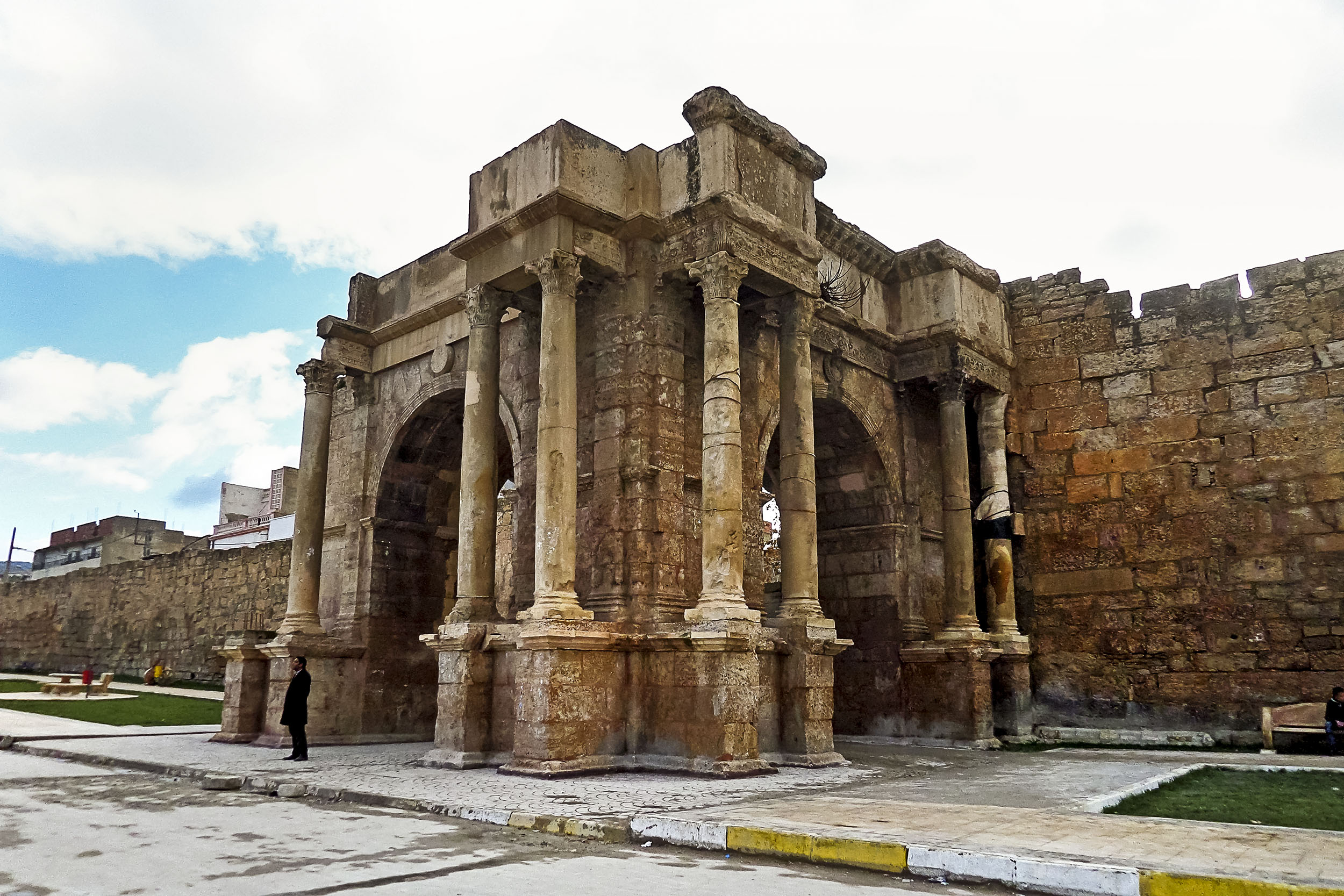
The Arch of Caracalla in Theveste, built c. 210 AD by a general from the city, dedicated to Emperor Caracalla

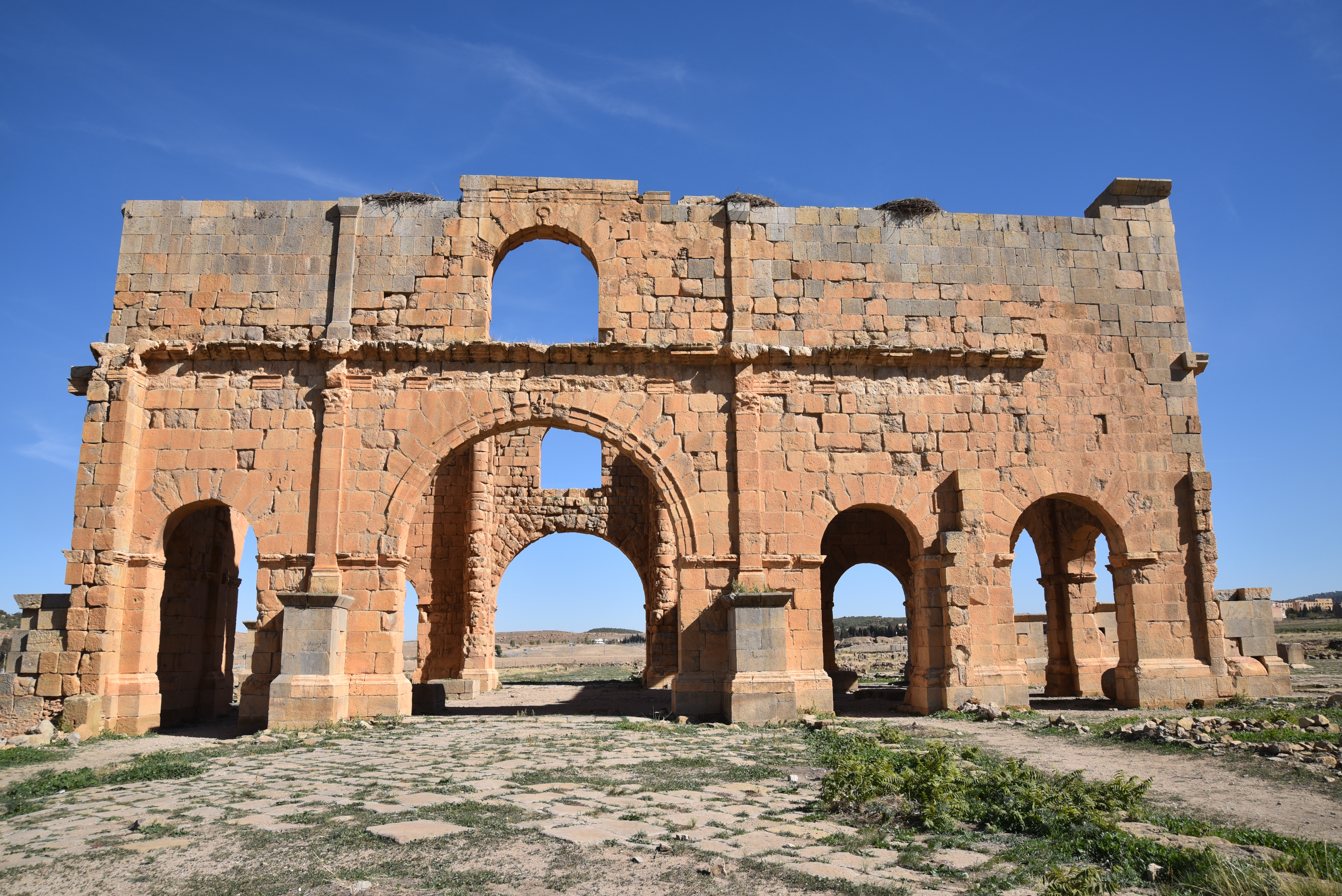
The camp of the Legio III Augusta in Lambaesis was established between 123–129 AD, in the time of Emperor Hadrian

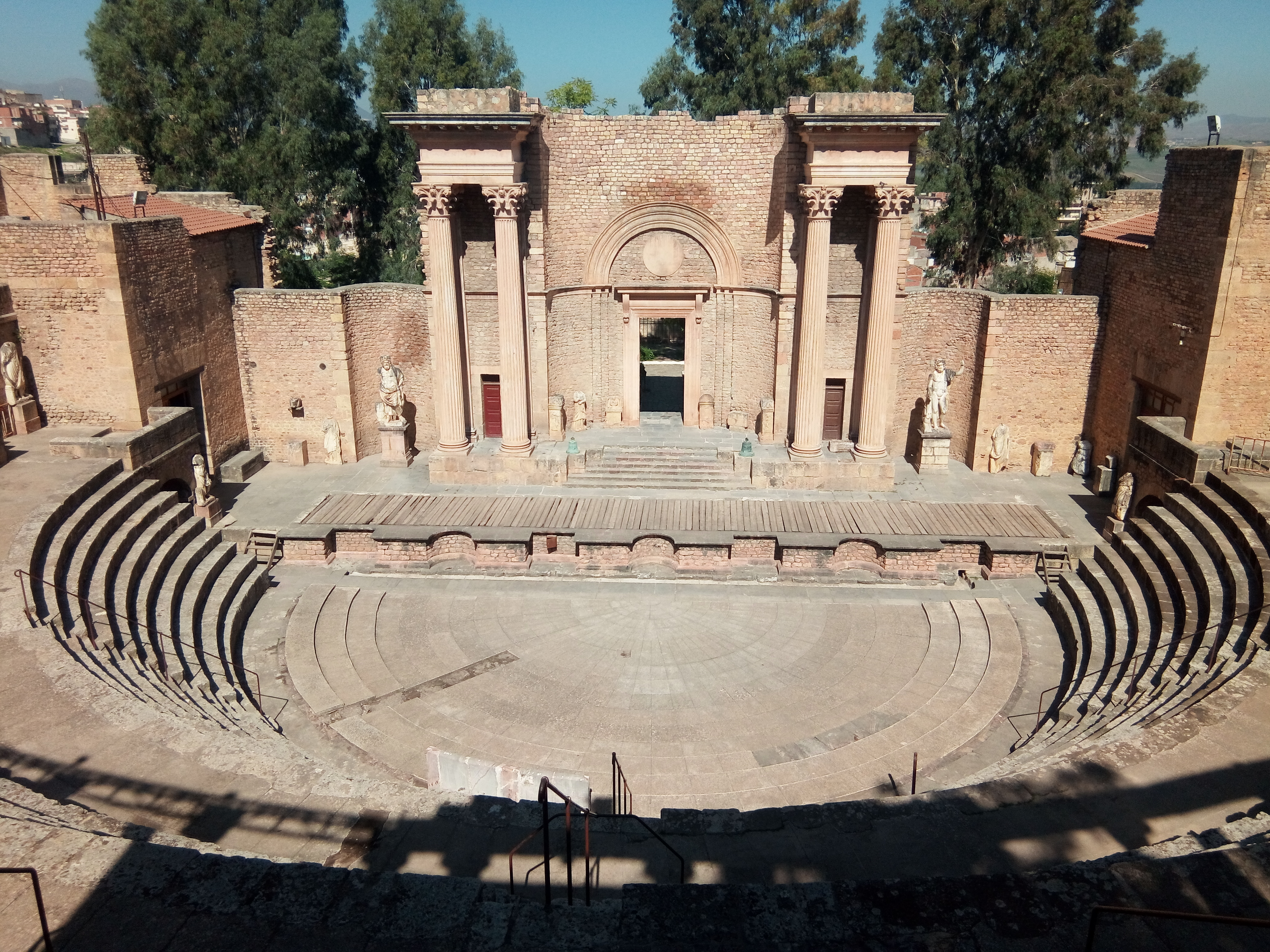
Roman theatre in Calama

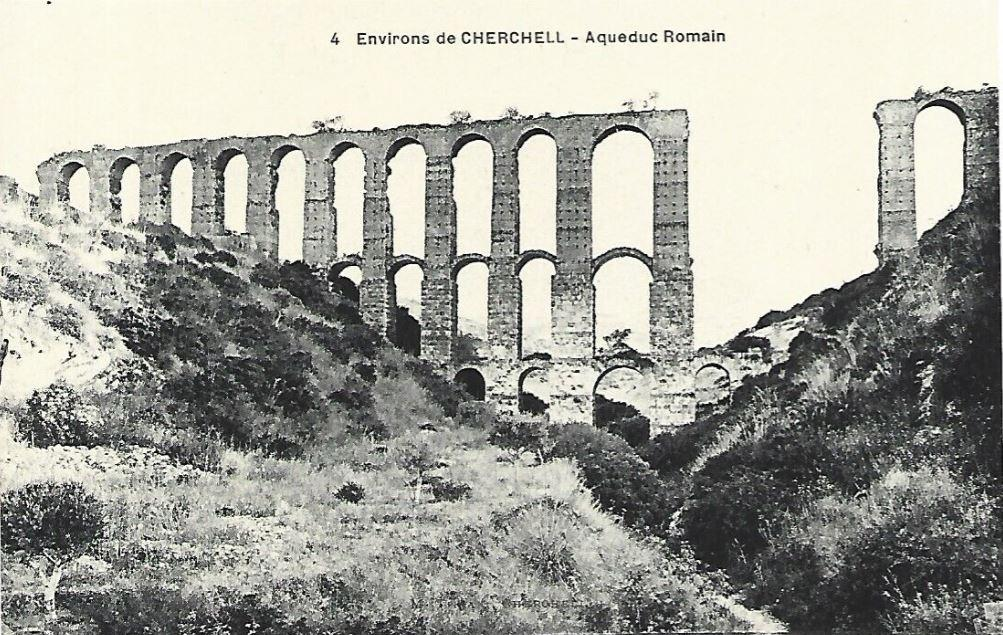
Roman aqueduct in Numidia

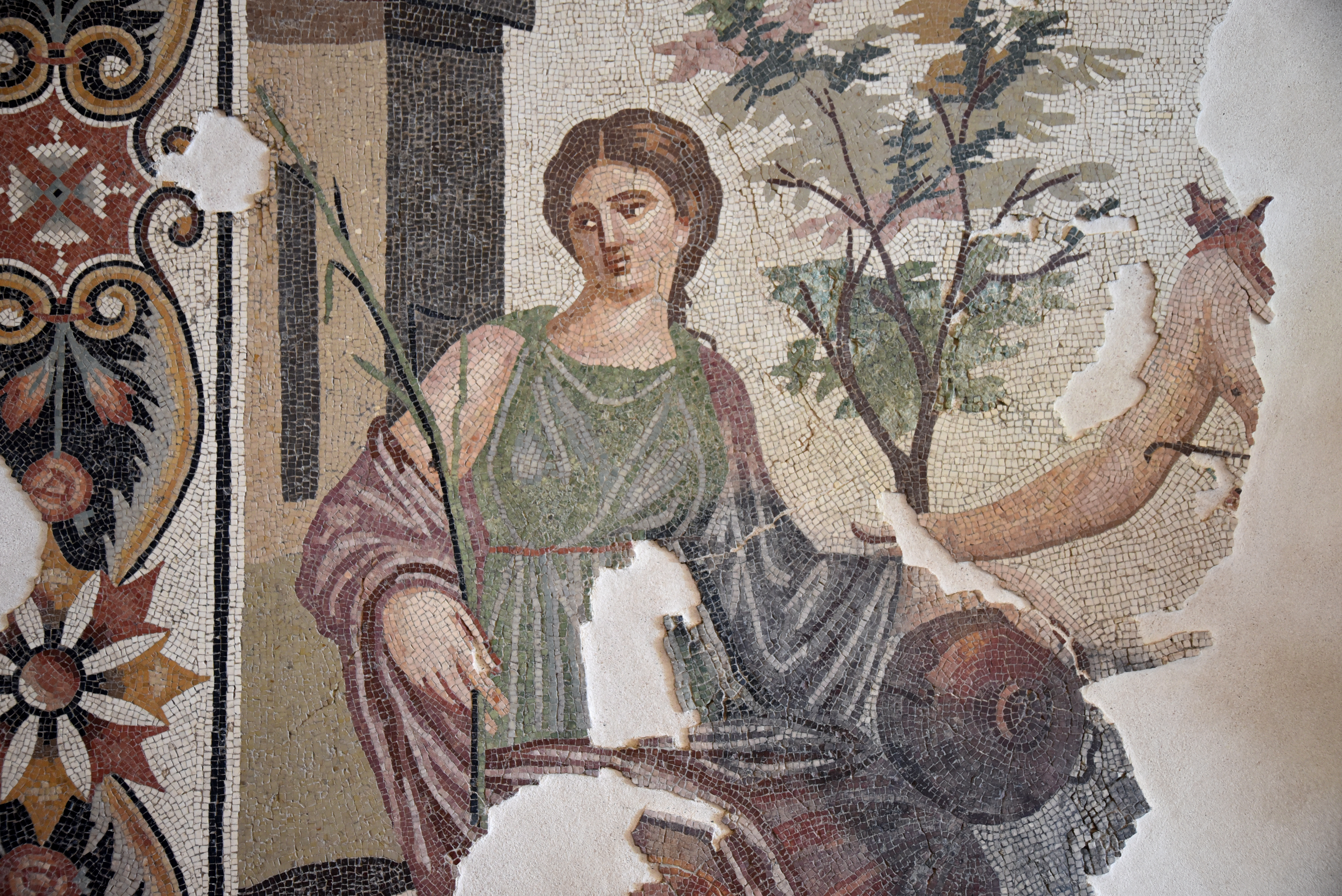
Mosaic at Lambaesis

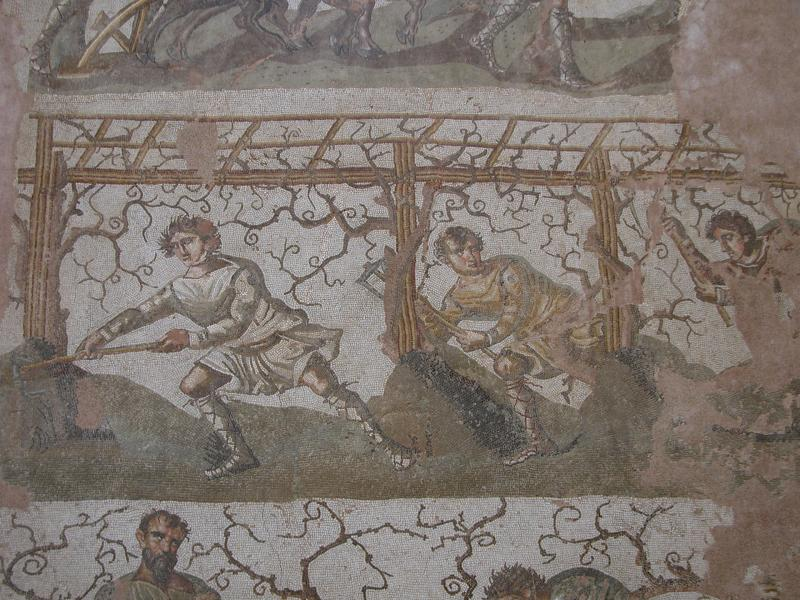
Mosaic of vineyard workers from Caesarea

Numidia as the other North African provinces became highly Romanized and was studded with numerous towns. The chief towns of Roman Numidia were: in the north, Cirta or modern Constantine, the capital, with its port Russicada (Modern Skikda); and Hippo Regius (near Bône), well known as the see of St. Augustine. To the south in the interior military roads led to Theveste (Tebessa) and Lambaesis (Lambessa) with extensive Roman remains, connected by military roads with Cirta and Hippo, respectively.

Lambaesis was the seat of the Legio III Augusta, and the most important strategic centre. It commanded the passes of the Aurès Mountains (Mons Aurasius), a mountain block that separated Numidia from Gaetuli Berber tribes of the Sahara desert, and which was gradually occupied in its whole extent by the Romans under the Empire. Including these towns, there were altogether twenty that are known to have received at one time or another the title and status of Roman colonies; and in the 5th century, the Notitia Dignitatum enumerates no fewer than 123 sees whose bishops assembled at Carthage in 479.

== Episcopal sees ==
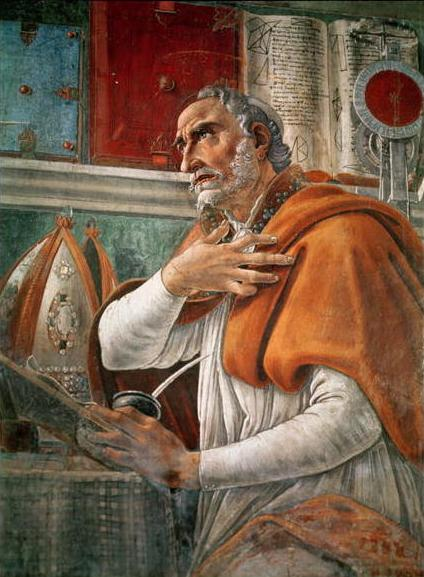
Saint Augustine was a theologian and philosopher of Berber origin and the bishop of Hippo Regius in Numidia

Ancient episcopal sees of Numidia listed in the Annuario Pontificio as titular sees:

- Alba (in the region of Qarentina)
- Ampora
- Aquae (Henchir-El-Hammam)
- Aquae Novae
- Aquae Thibilitanae (Hammam-Meskhoutine)
- Arae
- Arsacal (Goulia)
- Augurus (ruins of Sidi-Tahar and Sidi-Embarec?)
- Ausuccura (Ascours?)
- Azura
- Babra (ruins in the territory of Babar)
- Badiae (Badès)
- Bagai (Ksar-Bagaï)
- Baia (Henchir Settara? Henchir-El-Hammam?)
- Bamaccora
- Barica
- Belesasa
- Betagbara
- Bocconia
- Buffada
- Burca
- Caesarea (Youks-les-Bains, Henchir-El-Hammam)
- Caesariana (ruins of Kessaria)
- Calama
- Capsus, Numidia (Aïn-Guigba)
- Casae (El Madher)
- Casae Calanae
- Casae Medianae (Henchir-El-Taouil?)
- Casae Nigrae (near Negrine)
- Castellum (Henchir-Gastal)
- Castellum Titulianum
- Castra Galbae (Ksar-Galaba?)
- Cataquas (near Annaba)
- Cediae (Oum-Kif)
- Celerina (Guebeur-Bou-Aoun)
- Cemerianus
- Centenaria (Henchir-El-Harmel? Henchir-Cheddi?)
- Centuria (ruins of Aïn-Hadjar-Allah? Fedj-Deriasse?)
- Centuriones (ruins of El-Kentour)
- Ceramussa (Gueramoussa?)
- Chullu (Collo)
- Coeliana (Ain Tine)
- Cuicul (Djémila)
- Diana (Aïn Zana)
- Dusa
- Fata
- Fesseë
- Forma (ruins of Kherbet-Fraim?)
- Fussala
- Gadiaufala (Ksar Sbehi)
- Garba (ruins of Aïn-Garb)
- Gaudiaba
- Gauriana (Henchir-Gouraï?)
- Gemellae
- Germania (ruins of Ksar-El-Kelb?)
- Gibba (Henchir-Dibba)
- Gilba
- Giru Marcelli
- Girus (in the region of Djemila?)
- Girus Tarasii
- Guzabeta (ruins at Henchir-Zerdan?)
- Hospita
- Idassa (has namesakes) (near Merkeb-Talha)
- Idicra (Aïn-Aziz-Bin-Tellis)
- Iucundiana
- Iziriana
- Irzidzada
- Lambaesis (in the territory of Batna)
- Lambiridi (Kherbet-Ouled-Arif)
- Lamiggiga (Seriana)
- Lamphua (Aïn-Foua)
- Lamsorti (Henchir-Mâfouna)
- Lamzella (Henchir-Resdis)
- Leges (in the territory of Mila or Annaba)
- Legia
- Legis Volumni
- Liberalia (oasis of Lioua?)
- Limata (in the territory of Mila)
- Lugura (Aïn-Laoura?)
- Macomades (Merkeb-Talha)
- Macomades Rusticiana (Canrobert, Oum-El-Bouaghi?)
- Madaurus
- Mades
- Magarmel (Aïn-Moughmel?)
- Mascula (Khenchela)
- Mathara
- Maximiana (ruins of Mexmeia?)
- Mazaca
- Merouana (Lamasba)
- Mesarfelta
- Meta
- Midila (Mdila?)
- Milevum
- Mons (near Mdila)
- Moxori
- Mulia (ruins of El-Milia?)
- Municipa
- Musti
- Mutugenna (ruins of Aïn-Tebla?)
- Naratcata
- Nasai (Aïn Zoul?)
- Nebbi (in the territory of Tobma)
- Nicives (N'Gaous)
- Nigizubi
- Nigrae Maiores (Besseriani)
- Nova Barbara (ruins of Beni-Barbar?, Henchir-Barbar?)
- Nova Caesaris
- Nova Germania (near Khamissa)
- Nova Petra (ruins of Encedda?)
- Nova Sinna
- Nova Soarsa
- Octava
- Pauzera
- Pudentiana
- Regiana (Henchir-Tacoucht?)
- Respecta
- Ressiana (in the territory of Mila)
- Rotaria (Henchir-Loulou, Renier?)
- Rusicade (Skikda)
- Rusticiana
- Seleuciana
- Sigus
- Sila (Bordj-El-Ksar)
- Silli
- Sinitis (near Annaba)
- Sistroniana
- Sitifis (Setif)
- Suava
- Summa (ruins of Zemma?)
- Tabuda (Thouda)
- Tacarata (in the territory of Mila or in that of Annaba)
- Tarasa (Henchir-Tarsa?)
- Teglata
- Thagaste
- Thagora
- Thamugadi
- Theveste
- Thiava (near Annaba or Souk-Ahras)
- Thibaris
- Thibilis (Announa)
- Thinisa
- Thubunae (?Tubunae)
- Thubursicum (Khemissa)
- Thucca in Numidia (Henchir-El-Abiodh)
- Tiddi
- Tigillava (Mechta-Djillaoua)
- Tigisis (Aïn el-Bordj)
- Tipasa
- Tisedi (near Aziz-Ben-Tellis)
- Tituli (ruins of Aïn-Nemeur? ruins of Aïn-Merdja?)
- Tullia (near Annaba)
- Turres (in the territory of Annaba)
- Turres Ammeniae
- Turres Concordiae
- Tubusuptu (Tiklat)
- Turris Rotunda
- Ubaza (Terrebaza)
- Vaga (modern day Béja)
- Vadesi
- Vagada (ruins of El-Aria?)
- Vageata
- Vagrauta
- Vatarba
- Vegesela (ruins of Ksar-Bou-Saïd? of Ksar-El-Kelb? Henchir-El-Abiodh?)
- Velefi (ruins of Fedj-Es-Soyoud?)
- Verrona (Henchir-El-Hatba)
- Vescera (Biskra)
- Vicus Caesaris
- Vicus Pacati (Aïn-Mechara?)
- Villa Regis (near Tobna)
- Zaba (ruins of Tolga in the territory of Zab?)
- Zaraï
- Zattara (Bouchegouf District)
- Zerta (near Merkeb-Talha)

== Bibliography ==
- Stefan Ardeleanu, Numidia Romana? Die Auswirkungen der römischen Präsenz in Numidien (2. Jh. v. Chr.–1. Jh. n. Chr.) [Numidia Romana? The impact of the Roman presence in Numidia (2nd century BC-1st century AD)], Reichert, Wiesbaden 2021, ISBN 978-3-95490-509-6.
- Nacéra Benseddik, « Jugurtha-Cirta-Lambèse-Timgad » in Dictionnaire du Monde antique, PUF, Paris 2005.
- Yann Le Bohec, L’Afrique romaine (146 avant J.-C. - 439 après J.-C.), éd. Picard, 2005 (Paris), ISBN 2-7084-0751-1
- Filippo Coarelli and Yvon Thébert, "Architecture funéraire et pouvoir : réflexions sur l'hellénisme numide", Mélanges de l'École française de Rome: Antiquité, Année 1988, 2, p. 761-818
- François Décret and Mhamed Fantar, L’Afrique du Nord dans l’Antiquité. Histoire et civilisation - des Origines au Ve siècle, Paris, 1981.
- "Propriétés impériales et cités en Numidie Méridionale". Cahiers du Centre Gustave Glotz (3): 123–139. 1992..
