= Vandal War =

Vandal War may refer to:

- Vandal conquest of Roman Africa, a war of the Vandals and lans against the Western Roman Empire that included the Battle of Calama and Siege of Hippo
- Vandal War (439–442), a war between the Vandal Kingdom and the Western Empire
- Vandal War (461–468), a war between the Vandal Kingdom and the Western and Eastern Roman Empire that includes the Battle of Cape Bon (468)
- Vandalic War (533–534), a war between the Vandal Kingdom and the Eastern Roman Empire,
- Vandal war of 422 fought between The vandal king gunderic And Roman Magister Militum,Castinus

== See also ==
- Gothic and Vandal warfare
