= Vandal conquest of Roman Africa =

Fifth-century conflict

Vandalic conquest of Roman Africa
- Part of the Fall of the Roman Empire and Roman–Germanic Wars
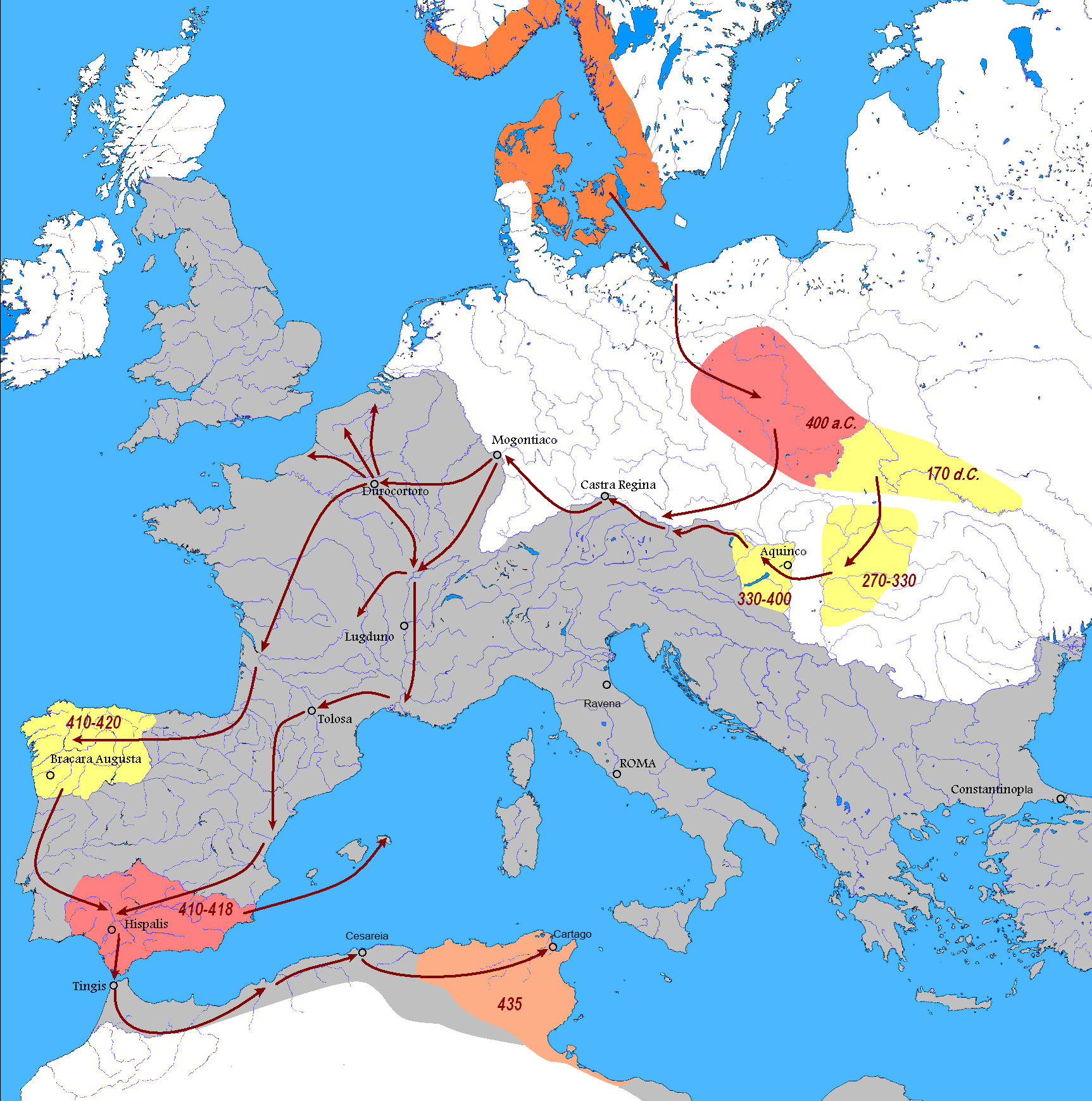
- Vandalic Migration and conquest of North Africa
Date	429–435, 439–442
Location	Africa Proconsularis and Mauretania, Western Roman Empire
Result	First Phase: Military stalemate; Vandals seize Mauretania; Second Phase: Vandalic victory: Vandals finalize their conquest

Belligerents
Vandals; Alans	Western Roman Empire; Eastern Roman Empire

Commanders and leaders
Geiseric; Huneric; Gento	Bonifatius; Aspar; Marcian (POW)

Strength
80,000 total people (Procopius' estimate); 20,000 warriors (modern estimates)	Unknown

Casualties and losses
Unknown	Unknown, but high

The Vandal conquest of Roman Africa, also known as the Vandal conquest of North Africa, was the conquest of Mauretania Tingitana, Mauretania Caesariensis, and Africa Proconsolaris by the migrating Vandals and Alans. The conflict lasted 13 years with a period of four years of peace, and led to the establishment of the Vandal Kingdom in 435.

== Primary sources ==
Saint Augustine of Hippo, Bishop Capreolus, Honoratus Antoninus, Prosper of Aquitaine, Theodoret, and Possidius wrote contemporary accounts of the Vandal invasion. Hydatius documented the Vandals' activities in the Iberian peninsula before crossing into Africa. Life of Augustine by Possidius was written before the Vandalic seizure of Carthage in 439. Victor Vitensis's A History of the African Province Persecution, in the Times of Genseric and Huneric, the Kings of the Vandals covered the Vandalic conquest and Roman counterattacks.

== Background ==
The Roman Empire had been in decline from the beginning of the fourth century, and divided into two since 395. North Africa had remained relatively stable, although beginning in the third and fourth century various Nomadic and semi-nomadic Berber tribes had put increasing pressure on the Roman provinces in Northwest Africa, often occupying parts of it (such as the Baquates seizing the abandoned Volubilis). However, fertile heartlands in the region remained under stable Roman rule throughout.

Meanwhile, starting in the late third century, the Romans came increasingly into conflict with the migrating Vandals, and East Germanic tribes speaking the Vandalic language. In 405 the Vandals crossed the Rhine along with various other Germanic tribes, and devastated Gaul. The Alans, Suebi, and Vandals entered the Iberian peninsula in 409. In 419 the Vandals and Alans were defeated by the allied forces of the Western Roman Empire at the Battle of the Nervasos Mountains, forcing the Vandals and Alans to abandon their territories, and their king, Gunderic, to flee to Baetica. In 422 Vandalic king Gunderic defeated the Romans in Baetica during the Vandal war, and in 425 proceeded to sack much of Hispania. In 428 Gunderic died, and was succeeded by Gaiseric, who possibly at the invitation of Bonifatius, Roman governor of the region, crossed into Africa.

The Roman provinces in North Africa were amongst its richest. In 429, Numidia provided a revenue of 33,600 solidi, 9,600 annonae, and 1,600 capita while Mauretania Sitifensis provided 40,000 solidi and 400 capita. The Chronica Gallica of 452 reported that walls were constructed around Carthage in 425.

== Invasion ==
In May 429, the Vandals first set foot on the continent in modern day Morocco, Tingi, crossing the Strait of Gibraltar. From there they rapidly swept east, defeating any resistance the weakened Roman army could set up. Bonifatius immediately started amassing an army to push them back (this contradicts later writer Jordanes, who claimed that Bonifatius invited the Vandals). It is notable that according to Procopius, the local Berber tribes did not play a major part in the conflict, until after the conquest was finished in 442.

=== The battle near Calama and the siege of Hippo ===
By 430 the Vandals had taken all of Mauretania and started pushing into Numidia. There, Bonifatius confronted the Vandals at the Battle of Calama. The Vandals inflicted a severe defeat on him and then pushed to the boundaries of modern Algeria. The Vandals besieged Hippo Regius in May or June; Augustine died during the fourteen month siege. The Vandals would be forced to lift the siege thanks to the attack of Bonifatius, now reinforced by Eastern Roman contingents led by Aspar.

=== The arrival of Aspar and the departure of Bonifatius ===
In 432 Bonifatius left for Rome where he was appointed Magister militum of the western armies, a position which he wanted to use to retake Africa, his power base for nearly a decade by that point. After leaving Africa, Bonifatius would soon die at the hand of his rival Flavius Aetius at the battle of Rimini. In 432, Aspar was yet again defeated in the region of Hippo Regius, where according to some sources Marcian, future emperor of Rome, was caught by the Vandals.

=== Peace and resumption of the conquest ===
Despite this, a sort of stalemate formed in the region, and on 11 February 435 the Vandals signed a peace treaty with the Romans at Hippo Regius, agreeing to be Foederati in return for seizing all of Mauretania Tingitana, Mauretania Caesariensis, and Numidia. The Vandals throughout the six years of war destroyed Altava (which was later rebuilt, and established as the capital of the Berber Kingdom of Altava), and devastated Tasacora, Portus Magnus, Thagaste, Sicca Veneria, Cartennae, Caesarea, Icosium, Auzia, Sitifis, Cirta, Calama, Thuburbo Majus, and Rusadir. In turn for the peace, Geiseric also had to give up Huneric, his son, to the Romans as a hostage for a short period of time.

In October 439 a new war began when the Vandals attacked Carthage without a declaration of war, and took the city without any resistance. Gaiseric selected the capture of Carthage, rather than his first year as king, as the beginning of his regnal year. The Vandals were only able to conquer 100,000 square kilometers of Roman Africa, less than one-third of its territory. The remainder was divided into autonomous areas and Berber states.

The Vandals continued their attack on the Romans by invading Sicily in 440, but withdrew within a year due to the arrival of an Eastern Roman fleet. This fleet, which was twice the size of the one that Belisarius had for his conquest of the Vandals, was preparing an attack on Carthage in 441. However, this attack never occurred as the Eastern Romans were forced to withdraw due to hostilities with the Huns and Sasanian Empire.

A peace treaty was signed in 442, in which the Vandals acquired Africa Proconsularis, Byzacena, eastern Numidia, and western Tripolitania while the Romans retained Mauretania Caesariensis, Mauretania Sitifensis, and western Numidia. The Vandals received the most fertile regions of Roman Africa. A marriage alliance between Huneric and Eudocia, the daughter of Emperor Valentinian III, was also made. The remaining Roman land in the area was seized by the Vandals after Valentinian's death in 455. Huneric was given as a hostage to the Romans and the Vandals had to pay an annual tribute.

== Christian persecution ==
The Vandals, who converted to Christianity between 406 and 421 according to Peter Heather, followed the theology of Homoiousian in contrast to the Christians of Roman Africa. The Vandals seized churches operated by Nicene Christians, including the Basilica Maiorum which housed the remains of Perpetua and Felicity, which would not be returned until the Byzantine conquest. Augustine feared that the Vandals would cause Christians to abandon the Nicene Creed. Possidius viewed the Vandal invasion as divine punishment for sins. Around 450, Quodvultdeus, the Bishop of Carthage, wrote in Book on the promises and predictions of God that the Vandals were the precursors to the Antichrist.

Capreolus wrote to the bishops attending the Council of Ephesus stating that the bishops from Africa would be unable to attend the council due to the Vandalic invasion. Pope Leo I reported that the Vandals raped nuns. Quodvultdeus was expelled to Campania by the Vandals in 439. The position of bishop of Carthage remained vacant for fifteen years until Gaiseric allowed Deogratias to be appointed on 24 October 454 at the request of Valentinian III.

The Liber genealogus, written by a follower of Donatism in 438, stated that Gaiseric was the Antichrist and his name's numerical value was 666. This text also identified Emperor Anthemius as the antichrist.

== Works cited ==
=== Books ===
- Conant, Jonathan (2012). Staying Roman: Conquest and Identity in Africa and the Mediterranean, 439–700. Cambridge University Press. ISBN 9781139048101.
- Decret, Francois (2009). Early Christianity In North Africa. The Lutterworth Press. ISBN 9780227903087.
- McEvoy, Meaghan (2013). Child Emperor Rule in the Late Roman West, AD 367-455. Oxford University Press. ISBN 9780191749544.
- Szada, Marta (2024). Conversion and the Contest of Creeds in Early Medieval Christianity. Cambridge University Press. ISBN 9781009426435.

=== Journals ===
- Fournier, Éric (2017). "The Vandal Conquest of North Africa: The Origins of a Historiographical Persona". The Journal of Ecclesiastical History. 68 (4). Cambridge University Press: 687–718. doi:10.1017/S0022046916002827.
- Miles, Richard (2017). "Vandal North Africa and the Fourth Punic War". Classical Philology. 112 (3). University of Chicago Press: 384–410. doi:10.2307/26543446. JSTOR 26543446.
