= Tannonia gens =

Ancient Roman family

The gens Tannonia was an obscure plebeian family at ancient Rome. Few members of this gens are mentioned in Roman literature, but many are known from inscriptions.

== Origin ==
The nomen Tannonius belongs to a large class of gentilicia ending in -onius, originally derived from cognomina ending in -o, but subsequently derived from a variety of names, after -onius had come to be regarded as a regular gentile-forming suffix.

== Praenomina ==
Nearly half of the Tannonii whose praenomina are recorded bore the name Lucius, the most abundant praenomen at all periods of Roman history. The remainder used a variety of other common names, including Gaius, Quintus, Marcus, Publius, Gnaeus, and Titus.

== Branches and cognomina ==
Although some of the Tannonii appear in inscriptions from Rome and elsewhere in Italy, the great majority are known from Roman colonies in the north African provinces of Africa Proconsularis, Mauretania Caesariensis, and Numidia, particularly Lambaesis, where the name appears from the second century onward. The Tannonii used a wide variety of common surnames without any apparent pattern, except that many of them bore the surname Felix, meaning "fortunate" or "happy".

== Members ==
This list includes abbreviated praenomina. For an explanation of this practice, see filiation.

- Tannonia Valentina, the wife of Marcus Antonius, with whom she dedicated a tomb at Novae in Moesia Inferior, dating from the latter half of the first century, for their children, Marcus Antonius Valentinus and Antonia Aprulla.
- Tannonius Marcellus, buried at Ammaedara in Africa Proconsularis, aged seventy, in a tomb built by his son, Tannonius Sterceius, dating from the first or early second century.
- Tannonius Sterceius, built a first- or early second-century tomb for his father, Tannonius Marcellus, at Ammaedara.
- Lucius Tannonius, named in a list of decurions at Rome, dating from the reign of Antoninus Pius.
- Lucius Tannonius, a native of Lambaesis in Numidia, was a soldier in the Legio II Augusta, and killed in battle. His wife, Macrinia, and their children built a second-century tomb for him at Lambaesis.
- Tannonius Maximus, a cavalry prefect named in a second-century dedicatory inscription from modern Gherla, formerly part of Dacia.
- Tannonius Pudens, a lawyer who brought forward the accusation of Sicinius Pontianus against Apuleius. Apuleius had married Sicinius' mother, Pudentilla, a woman of considerable wealth; Sicinius' father-in-law, Herennius Rufinus, urged him to sue Apuleius and prevent him from obtaining Prudentilla's money, alleging that Apuleius had seduced Prudentilla using magic. Apuleius' successful defense formed the basis of his Apologia.
- Quintus Tannonius Primus, a native of Uthina in Africa Proconsularis, was a veteran of the Legio II Traiana Fortis, listed in an inscription of Nicopolis in Roman Egypt, dating from AD 157. He served in the tenth cohort, and the century of Antonius Nereus.
- Tannonius, one of the patrons of a guild at Ostia in Latium, dating from AD 165.
- Gnaeus Tannonius Ingenuus, a youth buried alongside his mother, Gavia Sassa, in a second- or third-century tomb at Carthage, aged sixteen years, three months, and nineteen days.
- Tannonia Veneria, dedicated a tomb for her son, Lucius Neapolitanus Liberalis, at Puteoli in Campania, dating from the second century, or the first half of the third.
- Marcus Tannonius Gerinianus, the student of Julius Augurius, was a young man buried at Puteoli, aged eighteen years, eight months, and five days, in the latter half of the second century, or the first half of the third.
- Tannonius Victor, listed amongst a group of donors to a monument at Lambaesis, dating to AD 200.
- Lucius Tannonius Primus, a soldier in the fifth cohort of the vigiles at Rome in AD 205, serving in the century of Antullus.
- Lucius Tannonius Saturninus, a soldier in the fifth cohort of the vigiles in AD 205, serving in the century of Verinus.
- Lucius Tannonius Felix, a soldier in the fifth cohort of the vigiles in AD 210, serving in the century of Caesernius Senecio. Perhaps the same Lucius Tannonius "Felixs" mentioned in an earlier portion of the same inscription, dating from 205, and listing soldiers in the cohort of Antullus, or the Lucius Tannonius Felix serving in the century of Verinus, also in 205.
- Lucius Tannonius Fi[...], a soldier in the fifth cohort of the vigiles in AD 210, serving in the century of Ulpius Rutilianus.
- Tannonius Laetus, a duplicarius, or soldier entitled to double-pay, serving in the Legio III Augusta at Lambaesis, during the reign of Elagabalus.
- Lucius Tannonius Donatus, buried at Auzia in Mauretania Caesariensis, aged sixty, together with his wife, Flavia Quarta, aged fifty. Both are named in a dedicatory inscription, dating from AD 235.
- Tannonius Felix, a boy buried at Thugga in Africa Proconsularis, aged eleven, in a tomb dating between the middle of the second century, and the end of the third.
- Gaius Tannonius Sabbatius, one of the municipal officials at Ostia in AD 242.
- Publius Tannonius Saturninus, mentioned in a list of names from Lambaesis.
- Titus Tannonius Concordius, a member of a guild at Ostia in AD 262.
- Tannonius Victor, deacon of a church at Altava in Mauretania Caesariensis, mentioned in an inscription dating from AD 309, along with Tannonius Rufinianus and Lucius Tannonius Rogatus.
- Tannonius Rufinianus, named in an inscription from Altava dating from AD 309, along with Tannonius Victor and Lucius Tannonius Rogatus.
- Lucius Tannonius Rogatus, named in an inscription from Altava dating from AD 309, along with Tannonius Victor and Tannonius Rufinianus.
- Tannonius Felix, flamen of Zattara in Africa Proconsularis during the reign of Constans I and Constantius II, in the mid-fourth century.
- Tannonius Chrysantius, a Roman senator, had been governor of Byzacena. His eponymous son is known from inscriptions from Campania.
- Tannonius Chrysantius, son of the governor Chrysantius, is described as a vir perfectissimus, a high-ranking eques, named in an inscription from Liternum in Campania, dating to the reign of Valentinian I or Valens, and several inscriptions from Puteoli.
- Tannonius Monimus, along with his brothers, Tannonius Januarius and Tannonius Victor, dedicated a late fourth-century tomb at Numerus Syrorum in Mauretania Caesariensis for their mother, Valeria Julia.
- Tannonius Januarius, along with his brothers, Tannonius Monimus and Tannonius Victor, dedicated a late fourth-century tomb at Numerus Syrorum for their mother, Valeria Julia.
- Tannonius Victor, along with his brothers, Tannonius Monimus and Tannonius Januarius, dedicated a late fourth-century tomb at Numerus Syrorum for their mother, Valeria Julia.
- Tannonius, buried at Rome in AD 484, aged thirty-two years, thirteen days.

=== Undated Tannonii ===
- Tannonius, the husband of Valeriana, and father of Tannonius, a young boy buried at Arelate in Gallia Narbonensis.
- Tannonius, the son of Tannonius and Valeriana, a little boy buried at Arelate, aged six years, six months, and six days.
- Quintus Tannonius, named in a sepulchral inscription from Venusia in Samnium.
- Quintus Tannonius, a native of Mina in Mauretania Caesariensis, where he was buried, aged fifty, in a tomb dedicated by his son, Quintus Marcus Tannonius.
- Quintus Marcus Tannonius Q. f., a soldier in the Legio III Augusta, dedicated a tomb at Mina for his father, Quintus Tannonius.
- Tannonius Adiutor, buried at Thugga.
- Tannonia Annibonia, a woman buried at Carthage, aged thirty-two, in a tomb dedicated by her husband.
- Tannonia Antonia, the daughter of Tannonius Felix, married Valerius Processus, and was the mother of Valerius Antonius. She was buried at Caesaria in Mauretania Caesariensis, aged twenty-six, along with her father and son, in a family sepulchre built by her husband.
- Gaius Tannonius Celer, buried at Ucubi in Africa Proconsularis, aged ninety-one, alongside Julia Saturnina, perhaps his wife, aged sixty-five.
- Lucius Tannonius Claudianus, buried at Castellum Elefantum in Numidia, aged twenty-five.
- Lucius Tannonius Crescens, a native of Cirta, mentioned in an inscription from Lambaesis.
- Lucius Tannonius Crescens, named in a sepulchral inscription from Milevum in Numidia.
- Tannonia Q. f. Cyrilla, buried at Tiddis, aged thirty-three, with a monument from her husband.
- Tannonia Dativa, along with Julius Primus, dedicated a monument at Lambaesis to her brother, Tannonius Donatus.
- Tannonia Donata, buried at Mactaris in Africa Proconsularis, aged sixty.
- Tannonius Donatus, a soldier in the Legio III Augusta, buried at Lambaesis, aged thirty-five, with a monument from Julius Primus and Tannonia Dativa, his sister.
- Tannonia Faustina, buried at Castellum Fabatianum in Numidia, aged forty, with a monument from her brother, Gaius Julius Honoratus.
- Lucius Tannonius Faustinus Artius, buried at Bulla Regia in Africa Proconsularis, aged sixty-five years, nine months, and ten days.
- Tannonia Felicia, buried at Thala in Africa Proconsularis, aged thirty-five, alongside Elius Felix, perhaps her husband.
- Tannonius Felix, the father of Tannonia Antonia, and grandfather of Valerius Antonius, alongside whom he was buried at Caesaria in Mauretania Caesariensis, aged forty-eight, in a tomb built by his son-in-law, Valerius Processus.
- Gaius Tannonius L. f. Felix, a young soldier buried at Lamphua in Numidia, aged twenty-one.
- Marcus Tannonius Felix, a priest of Saturn, named in a dedicatory inscription from Soliman in Africa Proconsularis.
- Tannonius Felix Primianus, caretaker of the temple of Mercury at Tapphugabensis in Africa Proconsularis.
- Tannonia Fortunata, buried at Thala, alongside Marcus Duresius Barachianus, perhaps her husband.
- Tannonia Honorata, buried at Castellum Elefantum, aged forty-one.
- Marcus Tannonius Jucundus, a young man buried at Lambaesis, aged nineteen, with a monument from someone named Silvanus.
- Tannonia Juliosa, buried at Castellum Elefantum, aged thirty-eight.
- Publius Tannonius Justus, buried at Capsa in Africa Proconsularis, aged forty-three. Tannonius Saturninus is buried in the same tomb.
- Gnaeus Tannonius Major, an adiutor, or assistant, buried at Lambaesis, aged forty-five. He left his heirs a thousand sestertii, from which they erected his monument.
- Tannonia Paterna, a girl buried at Beneventum in Samnium, aged twelve years, four months, in a tomb built by her parents, Flavius Successus and Terentia Hermione.
- Tannonia Rogata, buried at Castellum Elefantum, aged twenty-five.
- Tannonia Romana, buried at Lambaesis, aged thirty-eight, with a monument from her husband, Julius Sedatus.
- Publius Tannonius Salutaris, buried at Lambaesis, with a monument from his son, Tannonius Speratus.
- Tannonia Saturnina, a young woman buried near the current site of Ain Kela Bou Seba in Algeria, formerly part of Africa Proconsularis, aged thirteen years, ten months, and fifteen days, in a tomb dedicated by her parents.
- Tannonius Saturninus, buried at Capsa, in the same tomb as Publius Tannonius Justus.
- Gaius Tannonius C. f. Saturninus, a young man buried alongside his father, Gaius Tannonius Victor, at Calama in Africa Proconsularis, aged twenty-three, in a family sepulchre built by his mother, Julia.
- Tannonius Secundus, named in a list of soldiers at Lambaesis in Numidia.
- Gaius Tannonius Secundus, a young man buried at Lambaesis, aged twenty, with a monument from his parents.
- Lucius Tannonius Secundus, named in an inscription from Portus in Latium.
- Tannonius P. f. Speratus, dedicated a monument at Lambaesis for his father, Publius Tannonius Salutaris.
- Tannonia Tertulla, a young woman buried at Thugga, aged fifteen.
- Tannonia Tue, (Note: The surname is probably erroneously written; the correct form is not apparent.) a girl buried at Castellum Fabatianum, aged seven.
- Lucius Tannonius Urbanus, buried at Castellum Elefantum, aged eighty.
- Tannonia Valeria, dedicated a tomb at Lambaesis for her husband, Quintus Mallius Donatus, aged seventy-five, who had been one of the duumvirs.
- Tannonia Valeria, dedicated a tomb at Lambaesis for her husband, Marcus Marius Saturninus, aged forty-one.
- Gaius Tannonius Victor, buried alongside his son, Gaius Tannonius Saturninus, at Calama, aged seventy-five, in a family sepulchre built by Saturninus' mother, Julia.

== See also ==
- List of Roman gentes

== Bibliography ==
- Lucius Apuleius, Apologia.
- Theodor Mommsen et alii, Corpus Inscriptionum Latinarum (The Body of Latin Inscriptions, abbreviated CIL), Berlin-Brandenburgische Akademie der Wissenschaften (1853–present).
- Bulletin Archéologique du Comité des Travaux Historiques et Scientifiques (Archaeological Bulletin of the Committee on Historic and Scientific Works, abbreviated BCTH), Imprimerie Nationale, Paris (1885–1973).
- René Cagnat et alii, L'Année épigraphique (The Year in Epigraphy, abbreviated AE), Presses Universitaires de France (1888–present).
- George Davis Chase, "The Origin of Roman Praenomina", in Harvard Studies in Classical Philology, vol. VIII, pp. 103–184 (1897).
- Paul von Rohden, Elimar Klebs, & Hermann Dessau, Prosopographia Imperii Romani (The Prosopography of the Roman Empire, abbreviated PIR), Berlin (1898).
- Stéphane Gsell, Inscriptions Latines de L'Algérie (Latin Inscriptions from Algeria, abbreviated ILAlg), Edouard Champion, Paris (1922–present).
- Ernst Diehl, Inscriptiones Latinae Christianae Veteres (Ancient Latin Christian Inscriptions, abbreviated ILCV), Weidmann, Berlin (1925–1931).
- Françoise Prévot, Recherches archéologiques franco-tunisiennes à Mactar (Franco-Tunisian Archaeological Research from Mactar), vol. 5, "Les inscriptions chrétiennes", Rome (1984).
- M. Khanoussi, L. Maurin, Mourir à Dougga: Receuil des inscriptions funéraires (Dying in Dougga: a Compendium of Funerary Inscriptions, abbreviated MAD), Bordeaux, Tunis (2002).
- Epigraphik-Datenbank Clauss/Slaby (EDCS).
