= Fidentius =

Fidentius (Italian: Fidenzio) may refer to:

- Fidentius and Terence, probably fictitious saints
- Fidentius Armenus (fl. 2nd century), legendary saint
- Fidentian (d. 304), bishop of Hippo Regius, martyr
- Fidentius (fl. 411), Donatist bishop of Collo
- Fidentius (fl. 705), bishop of Zuglio
- Fidentius of Padua (fl. 1226–1291), Franciscan friar
- Fidentius (fl. 1261–1274), bishop of Aversa
