= Battle of Calama =

Battle between Western Roman Empire and Vandals (430)

- Part of the Vandalic conquest of Africa; Fall of the Roman Empire and Roman–Germanic Wars
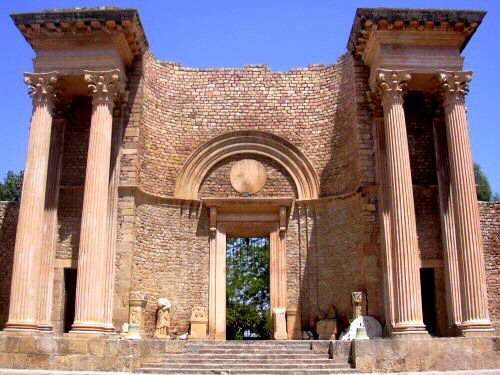
- Roman Theatre in Calama
Date	c. May 430
Location	Calama, Algeria
Result	Vandal-Alanian victory

Belligerents
Kingdom of the Vandals and Alans	Western Roman Empire

Commanders and leaders
Geiseric	Bonifatius

Strength
15,000–20,000	5,000–7,000; 15,000–20,000

Casualties and losses
Unknown	Unknown

The Battle of Calama was fought between the Western Roman Empire and the Vandals and Alans in the war known as the Vandal conquest of Roman Africa. The battle took place in May 430 near the city of Calama. The Roman army under command by comes Africae Bonifatius tried to stumble here the advance of the Vandals who crossed before the strait of Gibraltar under the leadership of King Geiseric.

== The march of the Vandals ==
The Vandals marched without much opposition to the area where the main cities were located, the grain barn of Africa: Africae Zeugitana. According to Possidius, bishop of Calama and eyewitness, the Vandals along the way destroyed everything they encountered:

«Fusing with cruelty and barbarity, crossing to our provinces and territories, they destroyed everything they could through their looting, murder and all kinds of torture, arson and other innumerable and unspeakable crimes, without regard to gender or age, nor did they spare the priests and men of God, nor the ornaments or vessels of the churches and the buildings..« Posssidius, Vita S. Augustini, chapter 28

== The Roman defense ==
In early 430, Bonifatius arrived in Africa to lead the war against the Vandal raiders. He put the regular field army into position supplemented with the expeditionary force of General Sigisvult who had been left behind after the civil war of 427-429. His own Gothic bucellari formed the core of this army. How large this army was is unknown, but must have been equivalent to that of Geiseric, otherwise Bonifatius would not have dared to fight. However, according to Wijnendaele, Bonifatius' army was much smaller. Geiseric' force consisted of Vandals and Alans, supplemented by a Gothic tribe and warriors of different origins and amounted to 15,000-20,000 fighters.

== The battle ==
According to Procopius, Bonifatius led the army of the Romans in the battle against the Vandals, but was defeated and forced to flee to the safety of the walls of Hippo. In the primary source material, Calama is not mentioned as the location where there was fought. However, there are strong suspicions that it was near Calama, because Possidius fled from here to Hippo as an eyewitness.

Bonifatius was overrun by Geiseric in the battle because he was a better strategist. In all his battles with the Romans, Geiserik emerged victorious, which was exceptional, as the Roman army had consistently been the dominant force until well into the fifth century. On the other hand, troops of Bonifatius, except his own bucellari, were not of the same quality as Geiserik's warriors. The Vandals were hardened in battle, while the army of the Romans was composed diverse and not used to acting as a unit. The Romans were eventually cornered and had to retreat to the fortified cities. Bonifatius entrenched himself with his bucellari in Hippo Regius which was then besieged by the Vandals. The nearby Camala was taken by the Vandals and partly destroyed.

== After the battle ==
According to Ian Hughes, the government of Ravenna must have sent urgent calls for help to Constantinople shortly afterwards, so that East Roman aid arrived in 431. The situation was critical. Boniface was besieged at Hippo and the Vandals were therefore in fact in possession of the grain barn of Western Rome, and it is very likely that the city of Rome again faced famine.

== Primary sources ==
- Hydatius, Chronicles
- Prosper, Epitoma Chronicorum
- Possidius, Vita S. Augistini
- Procopius, History of the Wars, Books III and IV (of 8) (translated by H.B. Dewing), The Project Gutenberg eBook

== Bibliography ==
- Heather, Peter (2005). The Fall of the Roman Empire: A New History. Macmillan.
- Raven, Suzan (2012). Rome in Africa. Routledge.
- Hughes, Ian (2012). Aetius: Attila's Nemesis. Barnsley: Pen and Sword Books.
- Wijnendaele, Jeroen P. (2015). The Last of the Romans: Bonifatius - Warlord and comes Africae. Bloomsbury. ISBN 978-1-78093-847-9.
- Syvänne, Ilkka (2020). Military History of Late Rome 425–457. Pen and Sword Books.
