= Capture of Carthage (439) =

Vandal capture of a Roman North African city

- Part of Vandalic conquest of Roman Africa
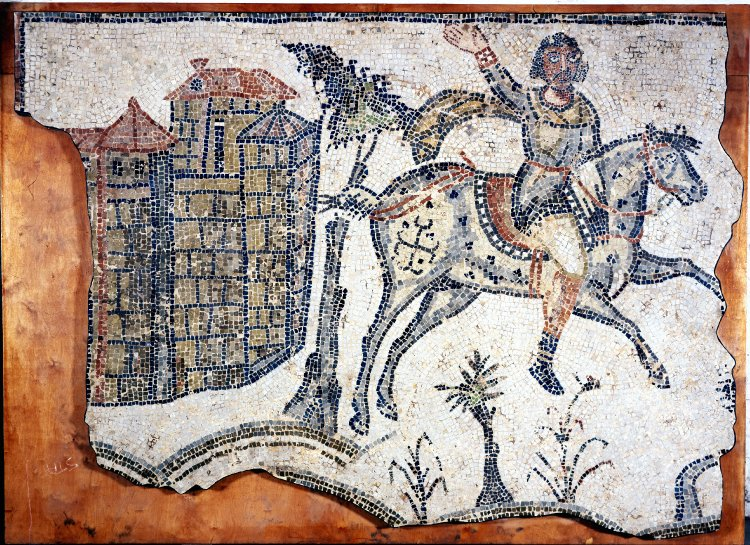
- Vandal cavalryman, c. AD 500, from a mosaic pavement at Bordj Djedid near Carthage
Date	19 October 439
Location	Carthage, Tunisia
Result	Vandal-Alanian victory

Belligerents
Kingdom of the Vandals and Alans	Western Roman Empire

Commanders and leaders
Genseric	Unknown

Strength
Unknown	Unknown

Casualties and losses
Unknown	Unknown

The Battle of Carthage of 439 was when the city of Carthage was captured by the Vandals from the Western Roman Empire on 19 October 439. Under their leader Genseric, the Vandals crossed the Strait of Gibraltar into Africa and captured Hippo Regius in August 431, which they made the capital of their kingdom. Despite an uneasy peace with the Romans, Genseric made a surprise attack against Carthage in October 439. After capturing Carthage, the Vandals sacked it and made it the new capital of their kingdom.

== Background ==
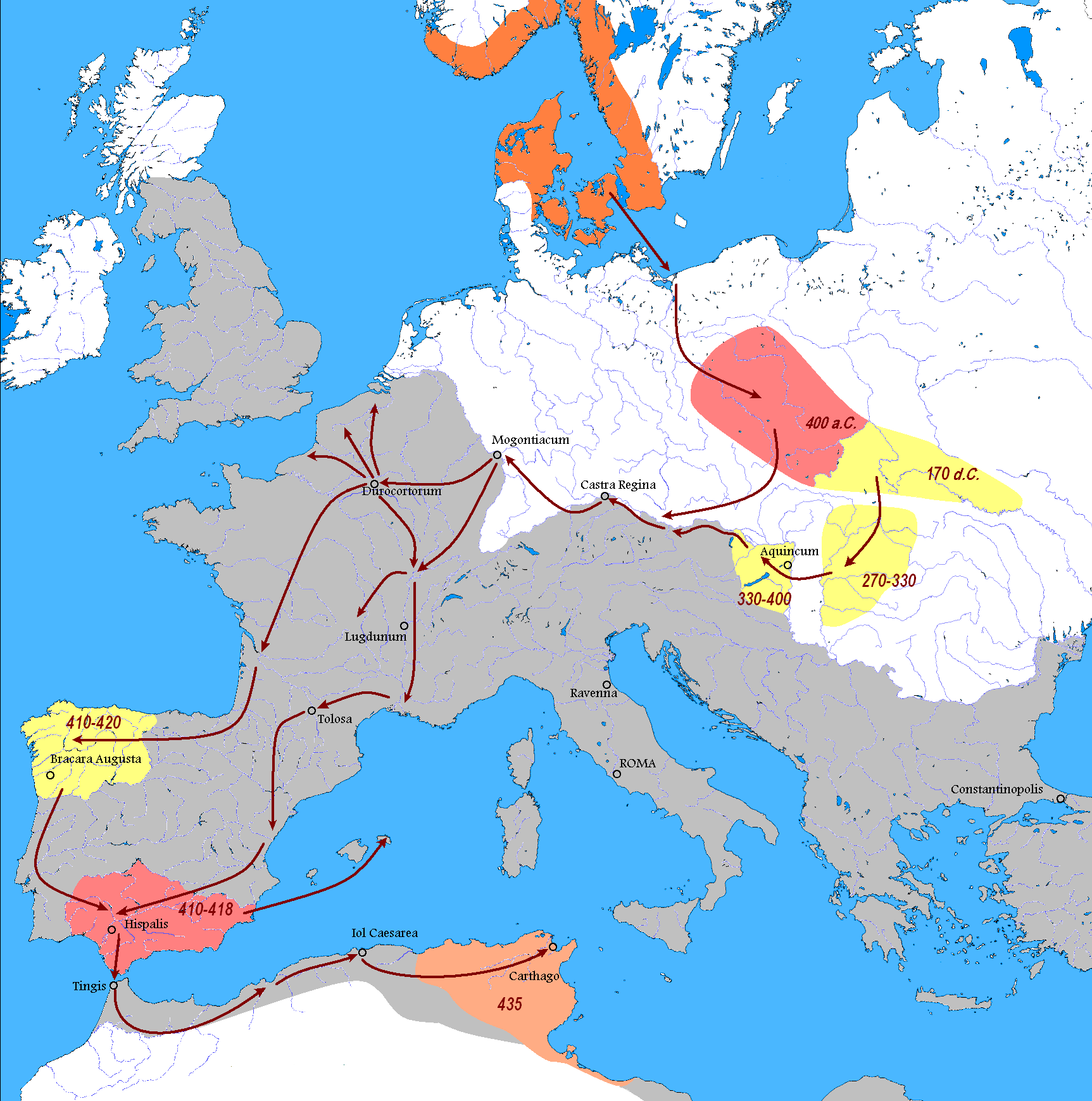
Vandals Migration

=== In Gaul ===
In 406, the Vandals advanced from Pannonia travelling west along the Danube without much difficulty, but when they reached the Rhine, they met resistance from the Franks, who populated and controlled Romanized regions in northern Gaul. Twenty thousand Vandals, including Godigisel, died in the resulting battle, but then with the help of the Alans they managed to defeat the Franks, and on 31 December 406 the Vandals crossed the Rhine to invade Gaul, which they devastated terribly. Under Godigisel's son Gunderic, the Vandals plundered their way westward and southward through Aquitaine.

=== To Spain ===
In 409, Godigisel's son Gunderic led the Vandals across the Pyrenees. They appear to have settled in Spain in two detachments. One, the Asdingi, occupied Galicia; the other, the Silingi, occupied Andalusia. Twenty years of bloody and purposeless warfare with the armies of the empire and with their fellow-barbarians, the Goths and the Suevi, followed. The Silingian Vandals were almost exterminated, but the remains of the Alani, a Turanian people from Iran, marched across Spain and took possession of Andalusia.

=== Over to Africa ===
Following his death early in the year 428, Gunderic was succeeded by his half brother Genseric. In May of 428, he assembled the Vandals on the southern shore of Andalusia, numbering approximately 80,000 people in total. They set sail later that year upon receiving an invitation from Bonifacius, count of Africa (although this is disputed by some scholars), who had fallen out of favor with the imperial court at Ravenna, and may have provided the ships needed to make the voyage. Following their crossing near Tingis, Bonifacius apparently asked the Vandals to return and leave Africa, a request that was refused. Leading a mixed army of Roman African and Gothic origin, he was defeated by Genseric near the town of Calama and retreated with the survivors of the battle to the city of Hippo Regius. Unimpeded, Genseric led the Vandals on a rapid conquest, and by May of the year 430 only three cities of Roman Africa (Carthage, Hippo and Cirta) remained in Roman hands.

== Siege of Hippo and capture of Carthage ==
The siege of Hippo Regius (May 430 to July 431) ended unsuccessfully for the Vandals. Peace was made on 30 January 435 between the emperor Valentinian III and Gaiseric. The emperor was to retain Carthage and the small but rich proconsular province in which it was situated, while Hippo and the other six provinces of Africa were abandoned to the Vandals.

Gaiseric observed this treaty until it no longer suited his purpose. On 19 October 439, without any declaration of war, he suddenly attacked Carthage and took it. The Vandal occupation of this great city, the third among the cities of the Roman Empire, lasted for 94 years. Gaiseric seems to have counted the years of his sovereignty from the date of its capture. Though most of the remaining years of Gaiseric's life were passed in war, plunder rather than territorial conquest seems to have been the object of his expeditions. He made, in fact, of Carthage a pirate's stronghold and attacked, in his words, "the dwellings of the men with whom God is angry."

He created probably the only barbarian fleet and was for 30 years the leading maritime power in the Mediterranean. Gaiseric's sack of Rome in 455, undertaken in response to the call of Licinia Eudoxia, widow of Valentinian, was only the greatest of his marauding exploits. He took the city without difficulty, and for 14 days, in a calm and business-like manner, emptied it of all its movable wealth. The sacred vessels of the Second Jewish Temple, brought to Rome by Titus, are said to have been among the spoils carried to Carthage by the conqueror. Eudoxia and her two daughters were also carried into captivity. One of the princesses, Eudocia, was married to Hunneric, eldest son of Gaiseric; her mother and sister, after long and tedious negotiations, were sent to Constantinople.

== Gallery ==
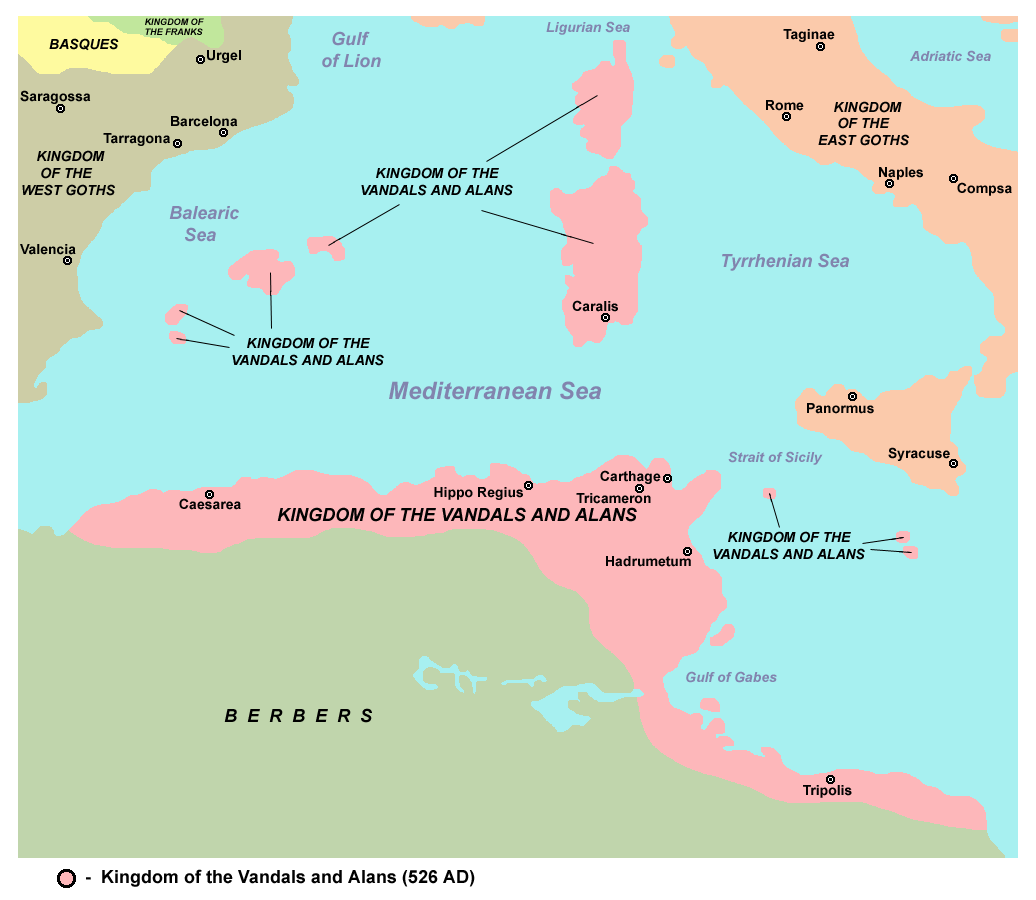
Vandal kingdom in Africa

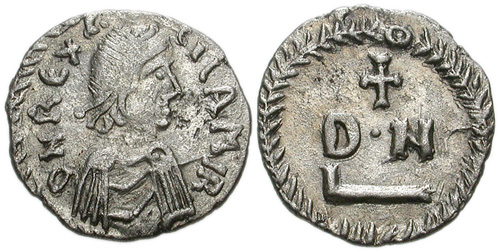
File:AR 50 Denarii minted in Carthage in 530–534

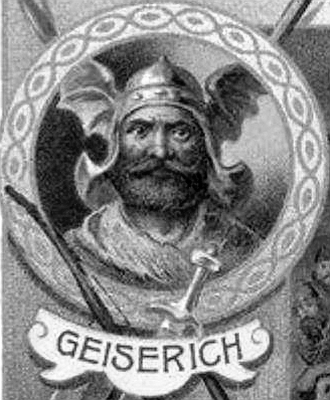
Genseric, King of the Vandals

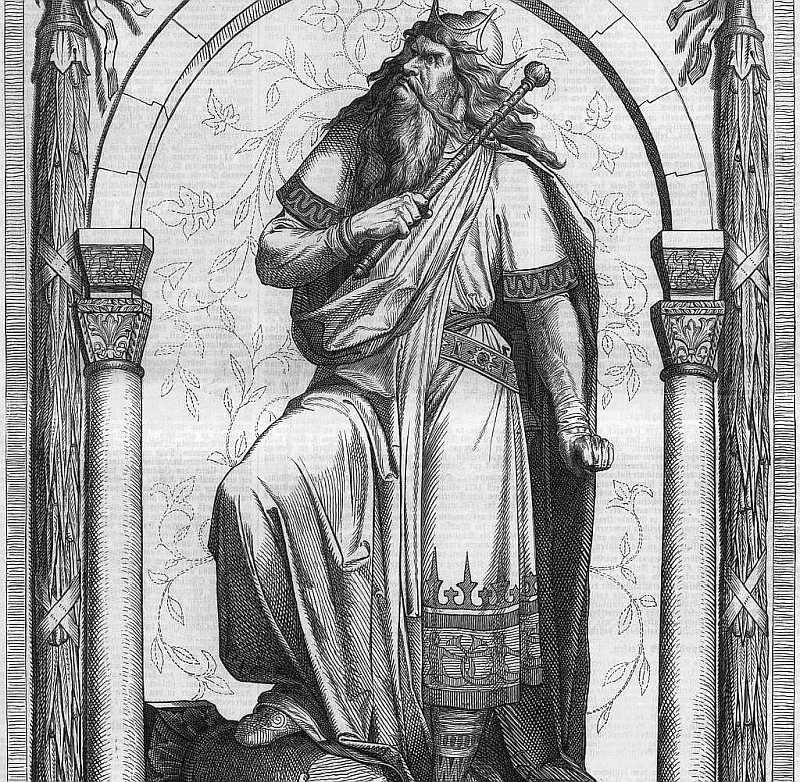
Genseric, King of the Vandals

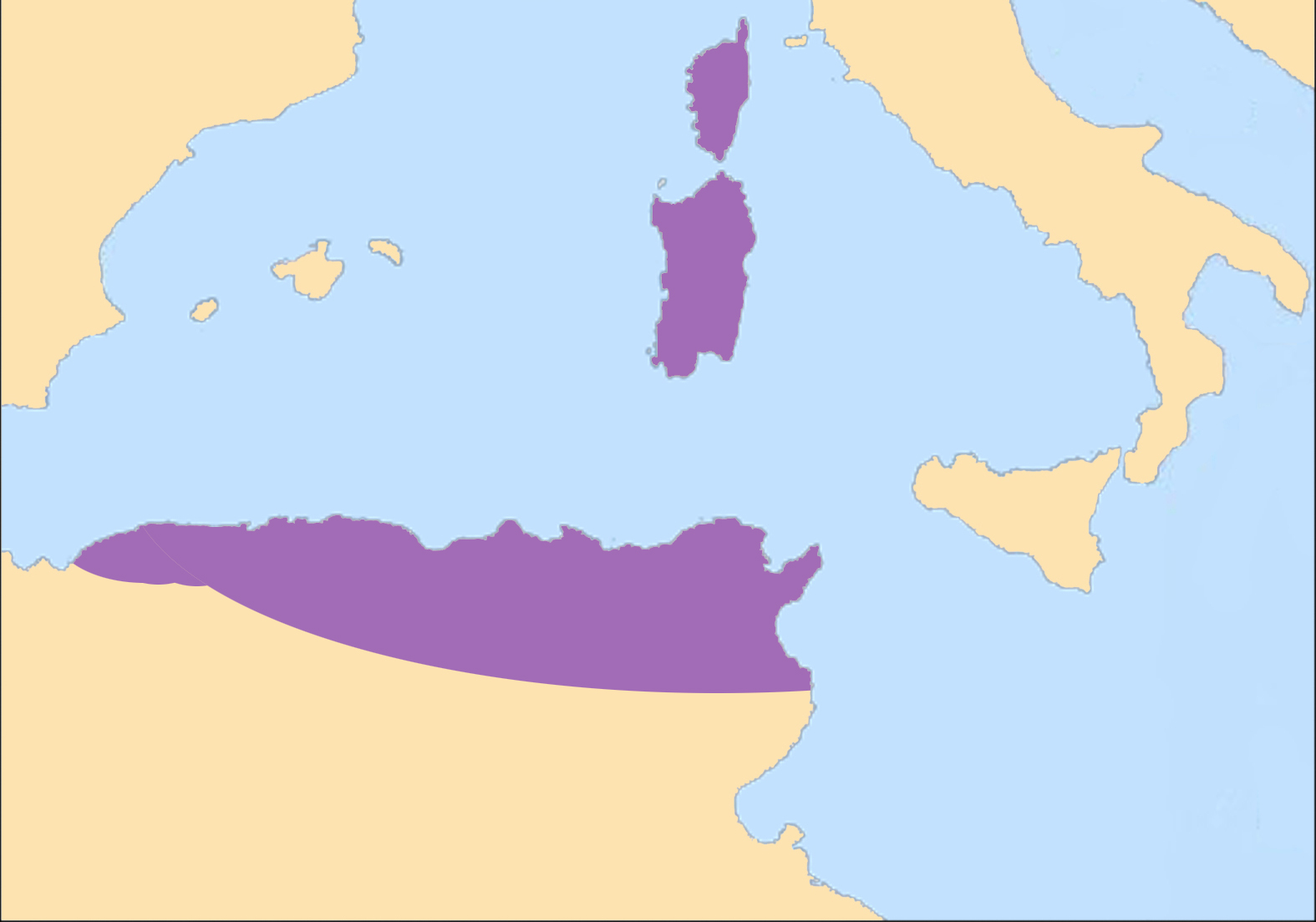
Map of the Vandal Kingdom in 455 AD
