= Siege of Hippo Regius =

Vandal siege from June 430 to August 431

- Part of the Vandalic conquest of Africa; Fall of the Roman Empire and Roman–Germanic Wars
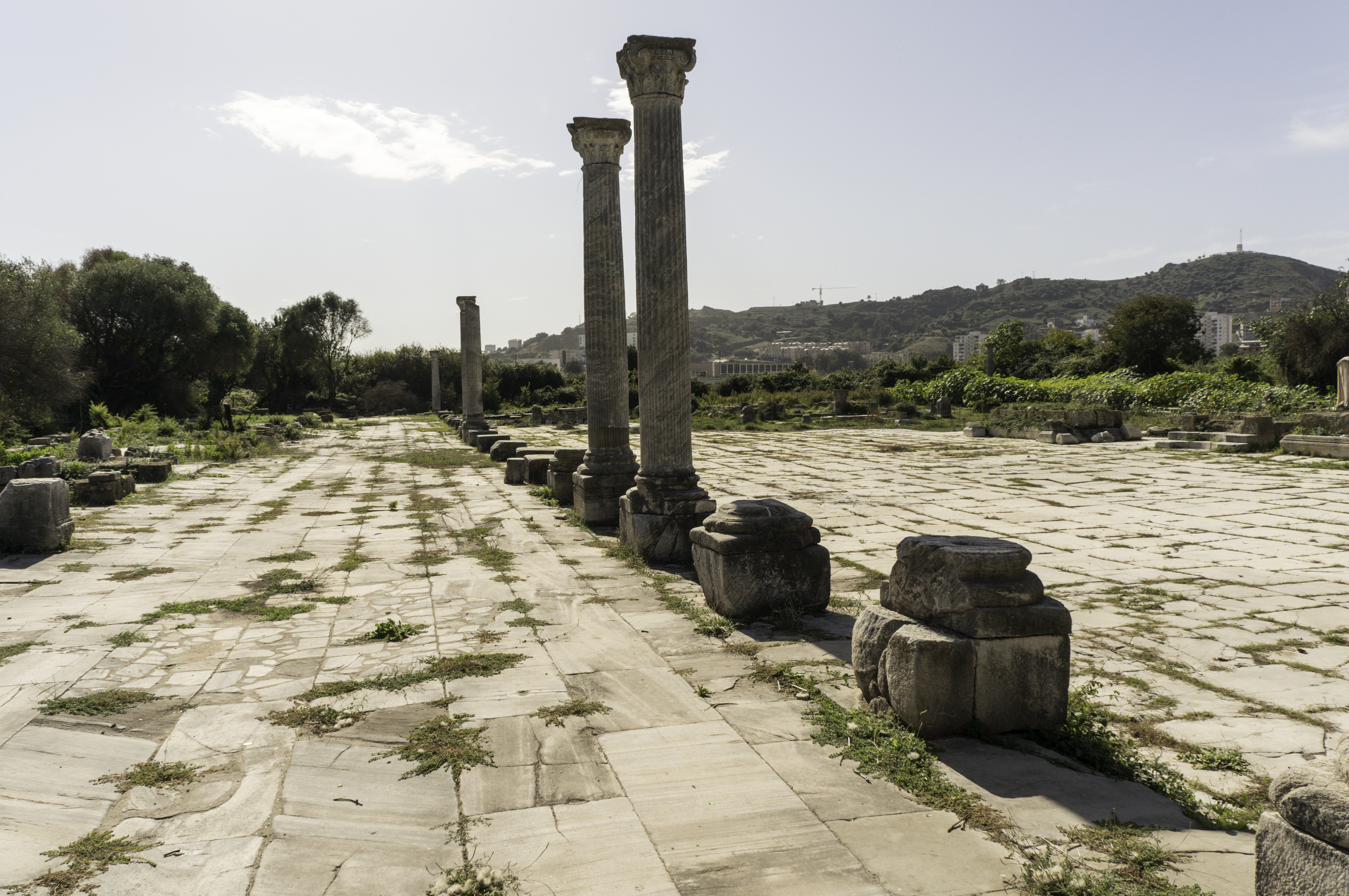
- Ruins of Hippo Regius
Date	June 430 – August 431
Location	Hippo Regius, Africa, Western Roman Empire (modern Annaba, Algeria)
Result	Tactical Roman victory (siege lifted); Strategic Vandal-Alanian victory

Belligerents
Vandals; Alans	Western Roman Empire

Commanders and leaders
Genseric	Boniface; Augustine of Hippo #

Strength
Around 15,000–20,000 fighting men	Less than 20,000

Casualties and losses
Unknown	Unknown

The siege of Hippo Regius was a siege from June 430 to August 431, carried out by the Vandals under their king Gaiseric against Roman defenders under Boniface, Count of Africa.

== Background ==
Boniface, freshly reconciled with imperial power in Rome, sought to oppose the advance of the Vandals in North Africa. After peace talks broke down, he confronted them militarily in the spring of 430, but was defeated. He then retreated with his federated Gothic troops to Hippo Regius, a fortified city occupying a strategic position. The city had by then already welcomed several thousand refugees from the surrounding provinces, including one of the main sources on this event, Bishop Possidius of Calama.

== Siege ==
The siege begins in May or June 430. While the bulk of the Vandal army imposed a land and sea blockade, detachments plundered the surrounding province. After 14 months, however, Gaiseric was the one short on supplies. The Vandals lifted the siege, making the ordeal a technical Roman victory. However, Boniface quickly abandoned the city by sea to meet with reinforcements from the eastern empire; the Vandals were able to occupy the town and subsequently defeated the combined Roman forces in a set battle.

Among those who died during the siege was St. Augustine.
