= James Francis McCarthy =

American Roman Catholic bishop

His Excellency, The Most Reverend James Francis McCarthy
- Auxiliary Bishop Emeritus of New York; Titular Bishop of Verrona
- Church: Roman Catholic Church
- Archdiocese: New York
- Appointed: May 11, 1999
- Installed: June 29, 1999
- Retired: June 15, 2002
- Other post: Titular Bishop of Verrona

Orders
- Ordination: June 1, 1968
- Consecration: June 29, 1999 by John Joseph O'Connor, William Wakefield Baum, and Edwin Frederick O’Brien

Personal details
- Born: July 9, 1942 (age 84) Mount Kisco, New York, US
- Motto: Evangelium gratiæ Dei (The gospel of the grace of God)

Styles of Francis McCarthy
- Reference style: His Excellency; The Most Reverend
- Spoken style: Your Excellency
- Religious style: Bishop

James Francis McCarthy (born July 9, 1942) is an American prelate of the Roman Catholic Church who served as an auxiliary bishop of the Archdiocese of New York in New York City from 1999 to 2002. McCarthy was forced to resign his post in 2002 after he admitted having sexual affairs with adult women.

== Biography ==
=== Early life ===
Born on July 9, 1942, in Mount Kisco, New York, James McCarthy attended Archbishop Stepinac High School in White Plains, New York. McCarthy then attended Cathedral College in Queens, New York, and St. Joseph Seminary in Yonkers, New York.

=== Priesthood ===
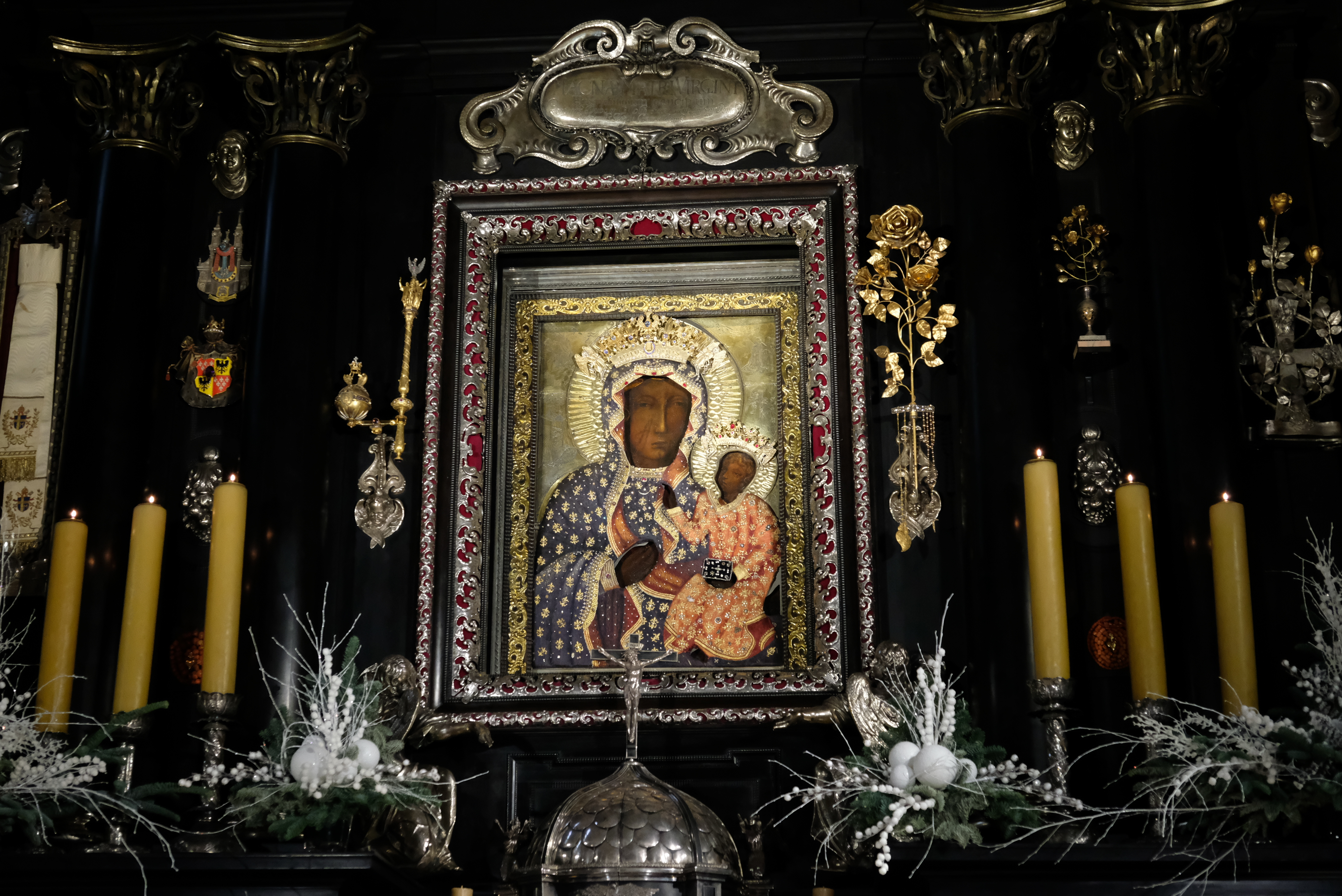
Black Madonna, Monastery of Jasna Gora in Czestochowa, Poland (2020)

McCarthy was ordained to the priesthood by Archbishop Terence Cooke at St. Patrick's Cathedral in Manhattan on June 1, 1968, for the Archdiocese of New York. After his 1968 ordination, the archdiocese assigned McCarthy as an assistant pastor at St. Denis Parish in Hopewell Junction, New York. He left St. Denis in 1976 to serve as pastor at St. Benedict's Parish in the Bronx.

In 1984, Cardinal John O'Connor named McCarthy as his priest-secretary. For the next few years, McCarthy accompanied O'Connor on official visits in the United States and other countries. In 1993, the two prelates visited Poland and Albania. McCarthy later wrote about visiting the Monastery of Jasna Gora in Czestochowa, Poland, home of the Black Madonna. They also visited the German concentration camps of Auschwitz and Birkenau

=== Auxiliary Bishop of New York ===
On May 22, 1999, Pope John Paul II appointed McCarthy as titular bishop of Verona and auxiliary bishop of New York. He was consecrated on June 29, 1999, by O'Connor at St. Patrick's Cathedral.

As auxiliary bishop, McCarthy served as pastor of St. Elizabeth Ann Seton Parish in Shrub Oak, New York while overseeing northern Westchester, Putnam and Rockland Counties.

In June 2002, Cardinal Edward Egan received a letter from a woman who claimed to have had a consensual affair as an adult with McCarthy. She said the relationship happened 20 years earlier when he was assigned to St. Benedict's Parish. When confronted with the woman's letter, McCarthy said the allegation was true. He also confessed to having consensual sexual contact with other adult women. At that point, Egan removed him from all of his ministerial duties.

It was later confirmed that McCarthy had revealed the affairs 15 years earlier during confession. Many of his former parishioners and friends in the clergy felt that McCarthy had been treated unfairly by the church. Some people theorized that McCarthy was the victim of a power struggle between Egan and of O'Connor supporters.

=== Resignation and legacy ===
On June 15, 2002, John Paul II accepted McCarthy's letter of resignation as auxiliary bishop of New York.

== See also ==
- Catholic Church hierarchy
- Catholic Church in the United States
- Historical list of the Catholic bishops of the United States
- List of Catholic bishops of the United States
- Lists of patriarchs, archbishops, and bishops
