= Tadeusz Werno =

Polish priest (1931–2022)

His Excellency Tadeusz Werno
- Auxiliary Bishop Emeritus of Koszalin-Kołobrzeg
- Metropolis: Szczecin-Kamień
- Appointed: 22 March 1974
- Term ended: 22 September 2007
- Other post: Titular Bishop of Zattara (1974–2022)

Orders
- Ordination: 24 June 1956 by Michal Klepacz
- Consecration: 25 May 1974 by Stefan Wyszyński

Personal details
- Born: 4 August 1931 Kaźmierz, Poland
- Died: 20 December 2022 (aged 91)

Tadeusz Werno (4 August 1931 – 20 December 2022) was a Polish Roman Catholic prelate.

Werno was born in Poland and was ordained to the priesthood in 1956. He served as the titular bishop of Zattara and as the auxiliary bishop of the Roman Catholic Diocese of Koszalin-Kolobrzeg from 1974 until his retirement in 2007.

Catholic Church titles
Preceded by —	Auxiliary Bishop of Koszalin-Kołobrzeg; 1974–2007	Succeeded by —
Preceded by Arthur Douville	Titular Bishop of Zattara; 1974–2022	Succeeded by Vacant
