= Mutugenna =

Ancient town in the Maghreb

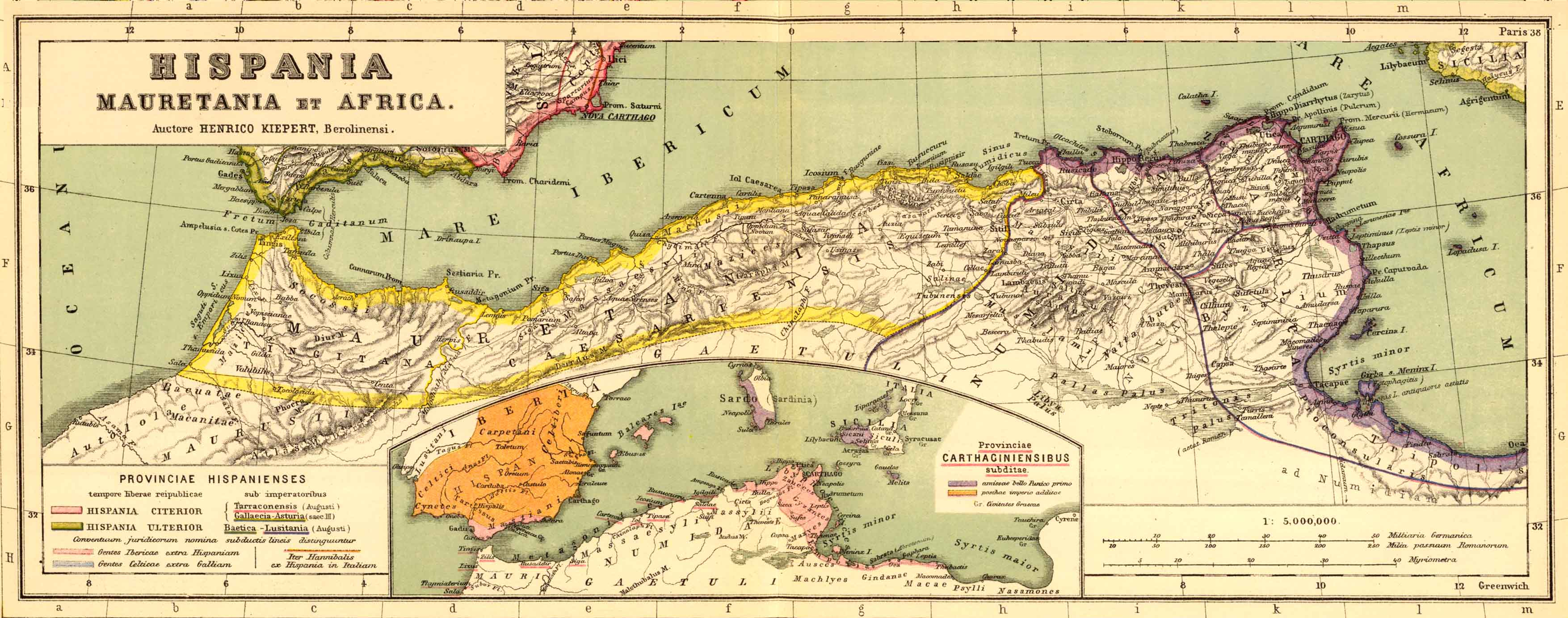
Numidia

Mutugenna or Muttegena was a colonia (town) of the Roman, Berber and Vandal empires, located in the Maghreb. The city is generally identified with the ruins at Ain-Tebla in modern Algeria. Mutugenna was also the locus of a bishopric and was an important site in the development of the Donatist schism.

The Diocese of Mutugenna (Dioecesis Mutugennensis) is today a suppressed and titular see of the Roman Catholic Church in the episcopal province of Numidia.

== Known bishops ==
- Antonio fl.411 (Catholic bishop)
- Splendonio (fl. 411) (Donatist bishop)
- Thomas Joseph Mardaga (December 9, 1966 – March 9, 1968)
- Philip Lussier, C.SS.R. (August 17, 1968 – December 15, 1970)
- William Mathias Schmidt, O.S.B. (June 10, 1972 – May 14, 1976)
- Bernardino Álvarez Rivera, O.F.M. (22 November 1976 – 12 July 2010)
- Roberto Bordi, O.F.M. (6 November 2010 Apostolic Vicariate of El Beni)

== Donatism ==
Muttugenna was an Early center of Donatism and Augustine of Hippo visited the town to confront the Donatist rebaptising. Indeed, only two bishops are known from Mutugenna, the two rival bishops at the Council of Carthage (411), Catholic Antonio and Donatists Splendonio.

The city was not far from Hippo and the bishop Augustine went there several times. On one occasion he heard there had been rebaptising of Catholics and he went to reproach the practise but was unable to find the people in question. Today Mutugenna survives as titular bishop; the current bishop is Roberto Bordi, auxiliary bishop of the Apostolic Vicariate of El Beni.
