= Fidentian =

Martyred bishop of Hippo Regius

Fidentian (Latin: Fidentianus) or Fidentius (Italian: Fidenzio) was the bishop of Hippo Regius from 303 until his martyrdom during the Great Persecution in 304. His predecessor, Leontius, was also martyred. He was the first of the Twenty Martyrs of Hippo to be executed after being imprisoned for refusing to make pagan sacrifices. A church at Hippo was later dedicated to the Twenty and at least one miracle was reported at it. Among Fidentian's companion martyrs were Valerian and Victoria. Augustine of Hippo later preached a sermon in their honour. Their feast day is 15 November in the Roman Martyrology, but they are not in the General Roman Calendar. The edition of the Martyrology of 1937 mangles their names ("Secundus, Fidentian and Varicus").
