= Zattara =

Byzantine and Roman town

Zattara was an ancient Roman and Byzantine town in the Africa province. It was located in present-day Kef ben-Zioune, south-east of Calama, Algeria. The city was a titular see of the Roman Catholic Church.

Zattara was a Roman municipality. Its stone ruins cover an area of fifteen hectares, hemmed in by the foothills of Kef Rih-west Hills and bounded on one side by a deep wadi ravine. A necropolis was also situated to the west. The edifices were destroyed in Roman times, but rebuilt by the Byzantines.

The citizens of the town seemed to serve in 6th legion (victrix).

There are many inscriptions at Zattara. Among these inscriptions is an important one attesting to its status as a municipium, which reads municipii Zat(taresis) porticu et rostris.

== Bishopric ==
The town was also the seat of an ancient bishopric in the province of Numidia. It was founded around 400AD but ceased to effectively function with the coming of Islam in the 7th century. The see was nominally refounded in 1927 and remains a titular today.

Known bishops

- Licentius Council of Carthage (411) fl.411. (Donatist) fl411.
- Gennaro or Januarius (fl 484) participated in the Council of Carthage (484) under the Vandal king Huneric and was one of the four prelates who presented the Arian king of the profession of the Catholic-faith African bishops.
- Felice (525–535) (Catholic)
- Cresconio (fl. 553) attended the Second Council of Constantinople in 553.
- Anton Oomen (1929–1957).
- Arthur Douville (1967–1970).
- Tadeusz Werno (1974–2022).
