= Possidius =

Bischop of Calama and friend of Augustine

Saint Possidius

Bishop of Calama
- Born: Northern Africa
- Died: c. 437; Apulia
- Venerated in: Catholic Church
- Canonized: August 19, 1672 by Pope Clement X
- Feast: May 16

Possidius (5th century) was a friend of Augustine of Hippo who wrote a biography and an indiculus or list of his works. He was bishop of Calama in the Roman province of Numidia.

== Biography ==
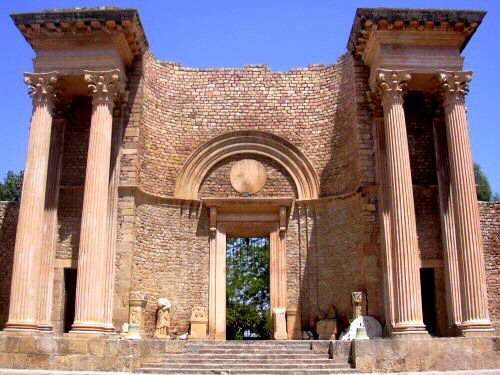
Possidius was bishop of Calama, Numidia

The dates of his birth and death are unknown. In the Vita S. Augustini (xxxi), after describing the death of Augustine, Possidius speaks of his unbroken friendship with him for forty years. He also, speaking of himself in the third person, lets it be known that he was one of the clergy of Augustine's monastery.

The date of his promotion to the episcopate was, according to Tillemont, about 397. He followed Augustine's example and established a monastery at Calama, an area much disturbed by factions. At a council held at Carthage, Possidius challenged Crispinus, the Donatist Bishop of Calama, to a public discussion which the latter refused. In 404 a party of Donatists dragged Possidius out of his house, beat him, and threatened his life. Donatist extremists set fire to a house where Possidius was visiting. Legal proceedings were instituted against Crispinus, the bishop, who refused to punish the presbyter responsible. Crispinus was condemned for heresy and was heavily fined, but at the intercession of Possidius the fine was not exacted.

In 407, Possidius served, with Augustine and five other bishops, on a committee appointed to adjudicate upon some ecclesiastical matter, the particulars of which are not known. In 408 he nearly lost his life in a riot stirred up by the pagans at Calama (Augustine, "Epp.", xc, xci, xciii). In 409 he was one of four bishops deputed to go to Italy to obtain the protection of the emperor against the Donatists. He was one of the seven bishops chosen to represent the Catholic party at the collatio of 411.

In 416 he assisted at the Council of Milevum, where fifty-nine Numidian bishops addressed a synodal letter to Innocent I, asking him to take action against Pelagianism. He joined with Augustine and three other bishops in a further letter to Innocent on the same subject, and was at the conference between Augustine and the Donatist Emeritus. When the Germanic Vandals invaded Africa, he fled to Hippo and was present at the death of Augustine (430).

In 437, according to Prosper, who, in his Chronicle, records that Possidius and two other bishops were persecuted and expelled from their sees by the Vandal king, Gaiseric, who was an Arian. Possidius died in Apulia shortly thereafter.

== Works ==
- His Vita S. Augustini, composed before the capture of Carthage (439), is included in all editions of the works of Augustine, and also printed in Hurter's "Opusc. SS. Patr.".
- His indiculus ('small index') will be found in the last volume of Migne's edition of the works of Augustine and in the tenth volume of the Benedictine edition.

== Canonization ==
Pope Clement X confirmed devotion to Possidius on August 19, 1672, along with his contemporary Alypius of Thagaste, another North African bishop who was a friend of Saint Augustine.

== Sources ==
- Weiskotten, Herbert T. (2008). The Life of Saint Augustine: A Translation of the Sancti Augustini Vita by Possidius, Bishop of Calama. Evolution Publishing, Merchantville NJ, U.S.A. ISBN 1-889758-90-6 ISBN 9781889758909
- Kuhn, Moritz (2023). Philologischer Kommentar zur Vita Augustini des Possidius von Calama. [Jahrbuch für Antike und Christentum, Ergänzungsband Kleine Reihe 17] (Latin text, German translation, philological commentary). Aschendorff, Münster, Germany. ISBN 978-3-402-10929-8
