= Henchir-El-Hatba =

Village and archaeological site in Tunisia

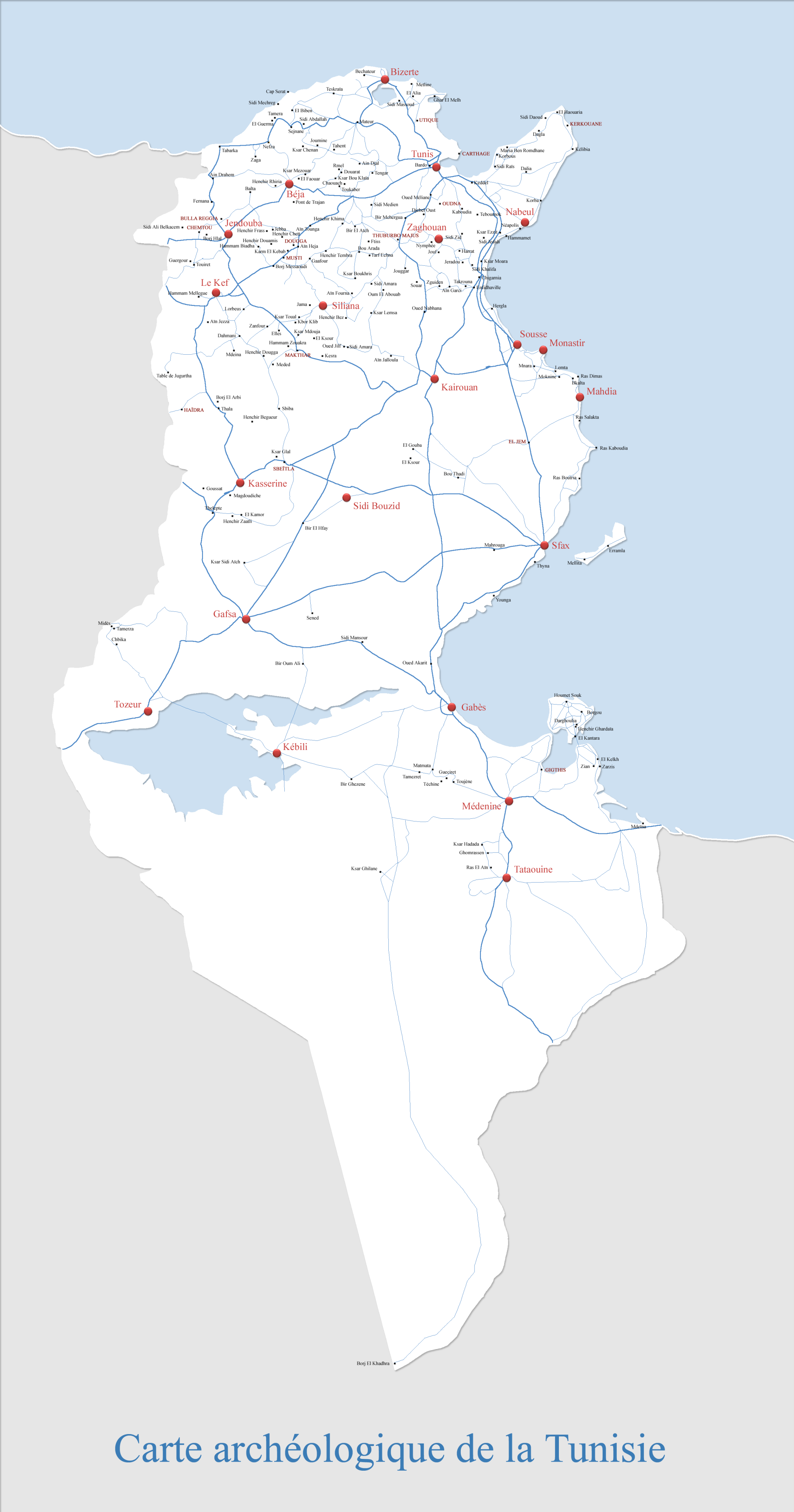
Archaeology map of Tunisia

Henchir-El-Hatba is a village and an archaeological site in Tunisia. It was a Roman Catholic diocese.

== Location ==
Henchir-El-Hatba also known as Ksar-el-Outibais located at 35.737815N, 8.62168E in Tunisia, 30km east of the border with Algeria

== History ==
Henchir-El-Hatba was settled in Roman times probably during the Roman Republic.

A broken inscription gives the Roman name as Fundus Ver... Although the full name is not known, the town is the seat of the ancient titular see known as Verrona, it is possible that the full Roman name was Fundus Verrona.

Inscriptions from Henchir-El-Hatba show it had colonia status and may have been the site of an imperial estate.

== Bishopric ==
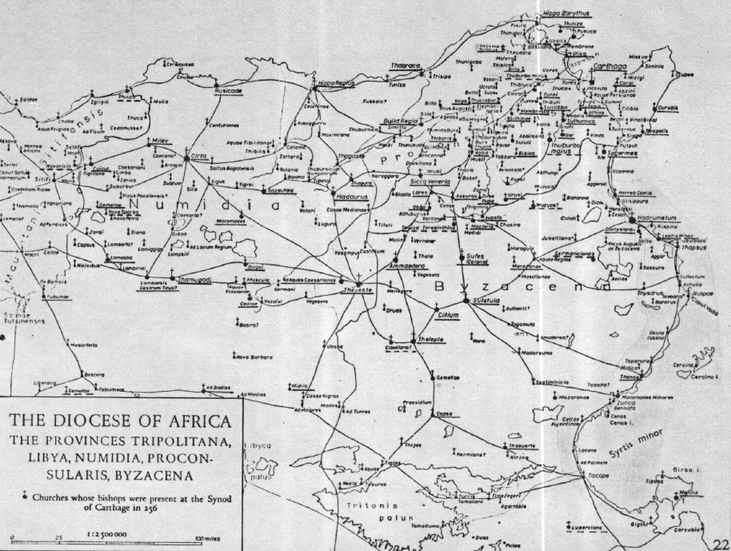
Dioceses of Africa, 256

An ancient Roman Catholic titular bishopric known as the Titular Episcopal See of Verrona in the province of Numidia, was located at Henchir-El-Hatba.

Known Bishops

- Titular Bishop James Francis McCarthy (1999.05.11 – ...)
- Titular Bishop Eric Gerard Perkins (1972.11.16 – 1998.05.22)
- Titular Bishop Eugenio Beitia Aldazabal (1965.01.23 – 1970.12.11)
