= Hippo Regius =

Ancient name for the modern city of Annaba, Algeria

- Hippone
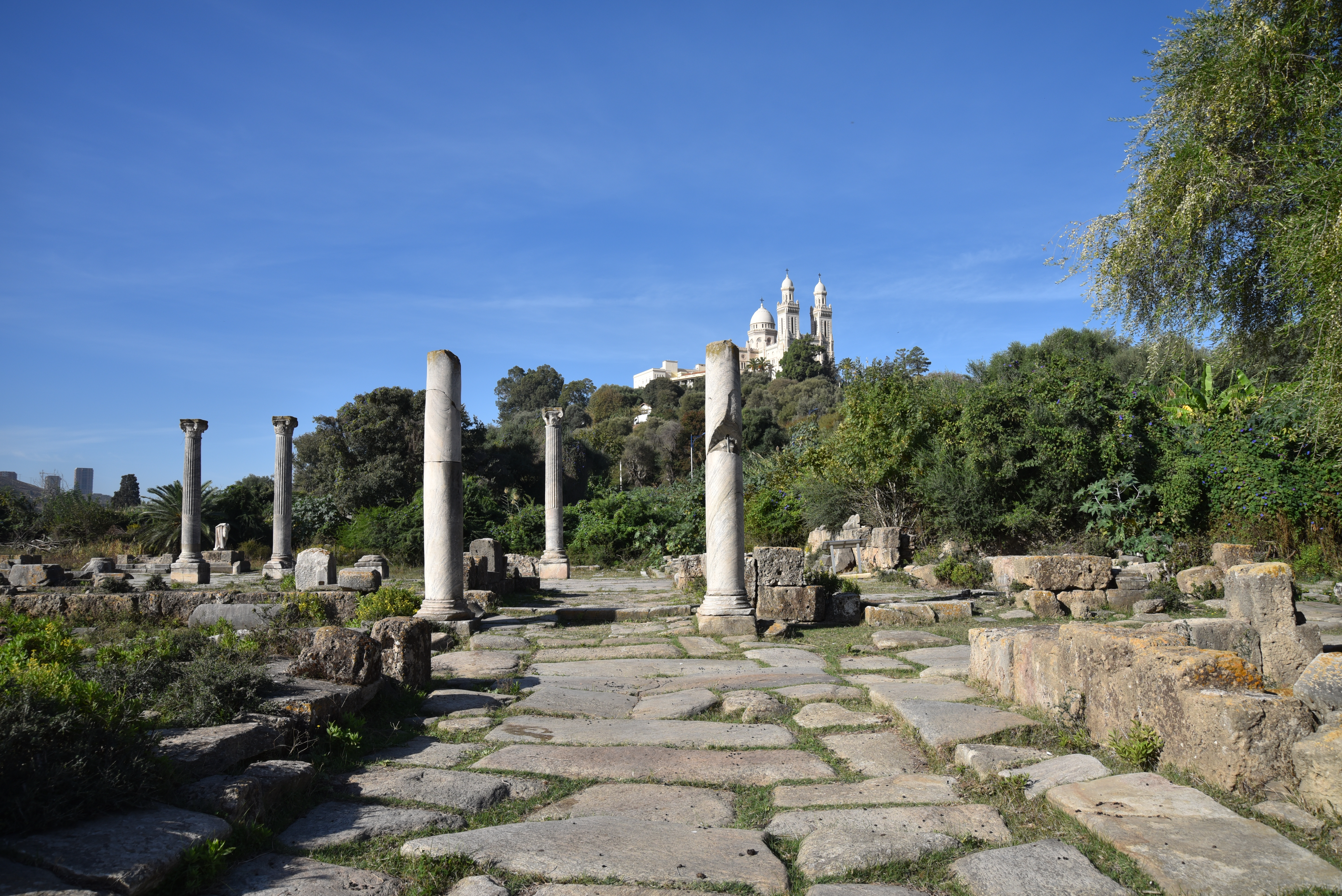
- Basilica of Saint Augustine overlooking the ruins of Hippo Regius

- Location within Algeria
- 36°52′57″N 07°45′00″E
- Location: Algeria
- Region: Annaba Province

Hippo Regius (also known as Hippo or Hippone) is the ancient name of the modern city of Annaba, Algeria. It served as an important city for the Phoenicians, Berbers, Romans, and Vandals. Hippo was the capital city of the Vandal Kingdom from AD 435 to 439. After the Vandal capture of Carthage in 439, Carthage became the capital.

It was the focus of several early Christian councils and home to Augustine of Hippo, a Church Father highly important in Western Christianity. (Note: "A Berber, born in 354 at Thagaste (now Souk-Ahras) in Africa, he died as Bishop of Hippo (later Bone, now Annaba) in 430, while the Vandals were besieging the town."Braudel 1995, p. 335)

== History ==
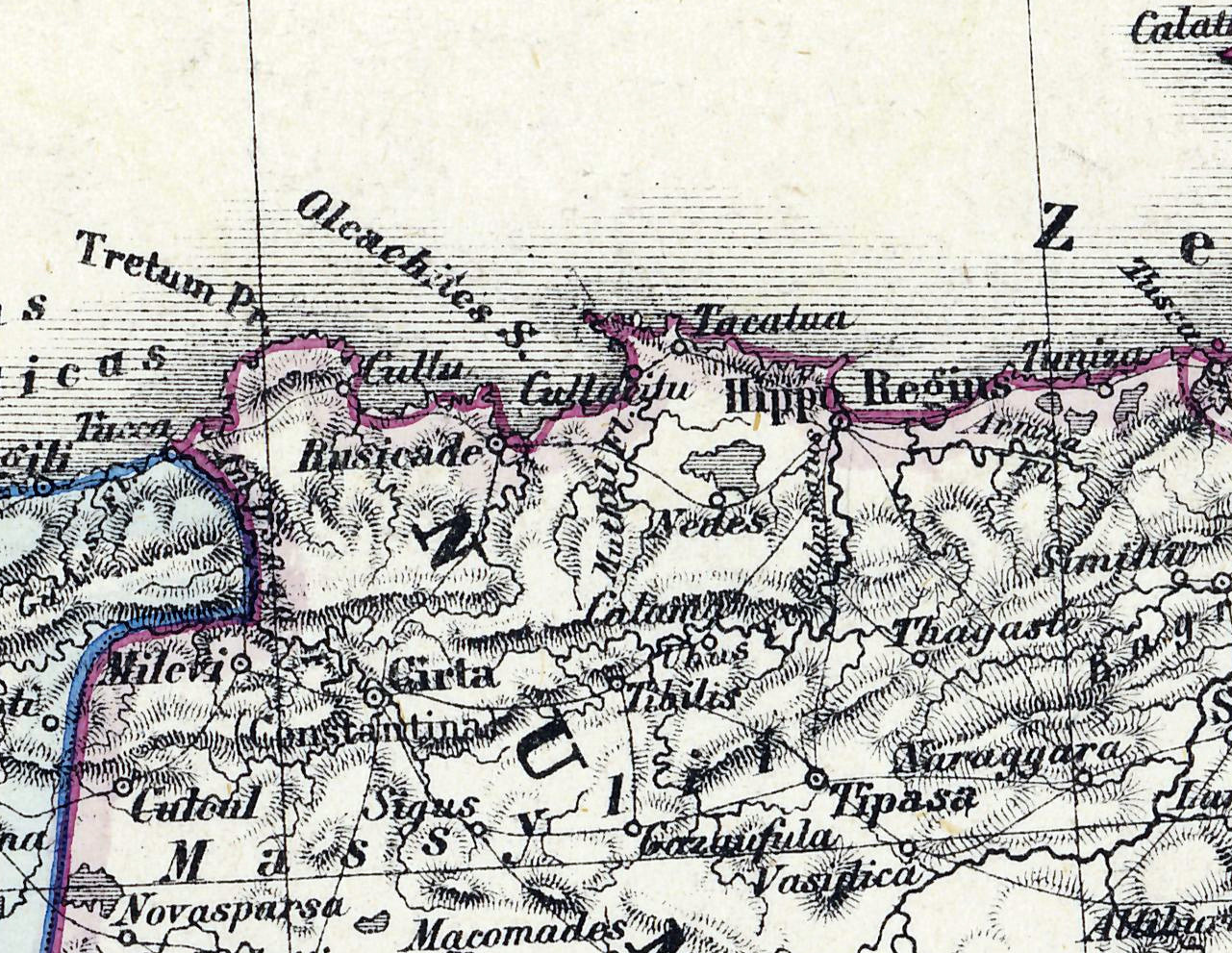
Hippo Regius on the map of Roman Numidia, Atlas Antiquus, H. Kiepert, 1869

Hippo is the latinization of ʿpwn (Punic: 𐤏𐤐𐤅𐤍), probably related to the word ūbōn 'harbor'. The town was first settled by Phoenicians from Tyre around the 12th century BC. To distinguish it from Hippo Diarrhytus (the modern Bizerte, in Tunisia), the Romans later referred to it as Hippo Regius ("the Royal Hippo") because it was one of the residences of the Numidian kings. The nearby river was Latinized as Ubus (now the Seybouse), and the bay to its east was known as Hippo Bay (Latin: Hipponensis Sinus).

A maritime city near the mouth of the Ubus, it became a Roman colonia that prospered and grew into a major city in Africa Province, and was incorporated into the Diocese of Africa under the reforms of Diocletian. It served as the bishopric of Augustine of Hippo in his later years.

In 430, the Vandals advanced eastwards along the North African coast and laid siege to the walled city. Inside, Saint Augustine and his priests prayed for relief from the invaders, knowing full well that the fall of the city would spell death or conversion to the Arian confession for much of the Christian population. On 28 August 430, three months into the siege, St. Augustine (who was 75 years old) died, perhaps from starvation or stress, as the wheat fields outside the city lay dormant and unharvested. Hunger and the inevitable diseases were ravaging both the city inhabitants and the Vandals outside the city walls, who lifted the siege after 14 months. The peace treaty of 435 acknowledged the Vandals' possession of the city and King Geiseric made it the first capital of the Vandal Kingdom until the capture of Carthage in 439.

It was conquered by the Eastern Roman Empire in 534 and was kept under Roman rule until the Muslim conquest in 698. The Caliphate rebuilt the town in the eighth century. The city's later history is treated under its modern (Arabic and colonial) names.

About three kilometres distant in the eleventh century, the Berber Zirids established the town of Beled el-Anab, which the Spaniards occupied for some years in the sixteenth century, as the French did later, in the reign of Louis XIV. France took this town again in 1832. It was renamed Bône, or Bona, and became one of the government centres for the Constantine Department in Algeria. It had 37,000 inhabitants, of whom 10,800 were original inhabitants, consisting of 9400 Muslims and 1400 naturalized Jews. 15,700 were French and 10,500 foreigners, including many Italians.

== Ecclesiastical history ==
Hippo was an ancient bishopric, one of many suffragans in the former Roman province of Numidia, a part of the residential see of Constantine. It contains some ancient ruins, a hospital built by the Little Sisters of the Poor and a fine basilica dedicated to St. Augustine. Under St. Augustine there were at least three monasteries in the diocese besides the episcopal monastery.

The diocese was established around 250 AD. Only these eight bishops of Hippo are known:

- Saint Theogenes(256? – martyr 259?)
- Saint Leontius (died 303?)
- Fidentius (martyr ?304)
- Valerius (388?–396), who ordained St. Augustine
- the "Doctor of Grace", Saint Augustine (354 – 28 August 430, coadjutor in 395, bishop in 396)
- Heraclius (coadjutor in 426, bishop in 430).
- Palmatius, attended Synod of Carthage in 525
- Urban, circa 705

It was suppressed around 450 AD.

=== Council of Hippo ===
Three church councils were held at Hippo (393, 394, 426) and more synods – also in 397 (two sessions, June and September) and 401, all under Aurelius.

The synods of the Ancient (North) African church were held, with but few exceptions (e.g. Hippo, 393; Milevum, 402) at Carthage. We know from the letters of Saint Cyprian that, except in time of persecution, the African bishops met at least once a year, in the springtime, and sometimes again in the autumn. Six or seven synods, for instance, were held under St. Cyprian's presidency during the decade of his administration (249–258), and more than fifteen under Aurelius (391–429). The Synod of Hippo of 393 ordered a general meeting yearly, but this was found too onerous for the bishops, and in the Synod of Carthage (407) it was decided to hold a general synod only when necessary for the needs of all Africa, and it was to be held at a place most convenient for the purpose. Not all the bishops of the country were required to assist at the general synod. At the Synod of Hippo (393) it was ordered that "dignities" should be sent from each ecclesiastical province. Only one was required from Tripoli (in Libya), because of the poverty of the bishops of that province. At the Synod of Hippo (393), and again at the Synod of 397 at Carthage, a list of the books of Holy Scripture was drawn up, and these books are still regarded as the constituents of the Catholic canon.

=== Titular episcopal see ===
The Hippo(ne) diocese was nominally revived in 1400 as Catholic Latin titular bishopric of the (lowest) episcopal rank, for which no incumbent is recorded.

It ceased to exist on 23 September 1867, when the see was formally united with the Roman Catholic Diocese of Constantine.

== See also ==
- Auzia
- Caesarea of Mauretania
- Cirta
- Chullu
- Mauretania Caesariensis
- Milevum
- List of cultural assets of Algeria

== Sources ==
- Braudel, Fernand (1995). A History of Civilizations. Penguin. ISBN 978-0-14-012489-7.
- Brown, Peter (2013), Through the Eye of a Needle: Wealth, the Fall of Rome, and the Making of Christianity in the West, 350–550 AD, Princeton: Princeton University Press, ISBN 978-1400844531
- Ghaki, Mansour (2015), "Toponymie et Onomastique Libyques: L'Apport de l'Écriture Punique/Néopunique" (PDF), La Lingua nella Vita e la Vita della Lingua: Itinerari e Percorsi degli Studi Berberi, Studi Africanistici: Quaderni di Studi Berberi e Libico-Berberi (in French), vol. 4, Naples: Unior, pp. 65–71, ISBN 978-88-6719-125-3, ISSN 2283-5636, archived from the original (PDF) on 28 April 2020
- Havey, Francis Patrick (1907). "African Synods" . In Herbermann, Charles (ed.). Catholic Encyclopedia. Vol. 1. New York: Robert Appleton Company.
- Head, Barclay; Hill, G.F.; MacDonald, George; Wroth, W. (1911), "Numidia", in Ed Snible (ed.), Historia Numorum (2nd ed.), Oxford: Clarendon Press, pp. 884–887
- Merrills, Andrew; Miles, Richard (2009). The Vandals. John Wiley & Sons. ISBN 978-1-4443-1808-1.
- Pétridès, Sophron (1910). "Hippo Regius" . In Herbermann, Charles (ed.). Catholic Encyclopedia. Vol. 7. New York: Robert Appleton Company.
- Portalié, Eugène (1907). "St. Augustine of Hippo" . In Herbermann, Charles (ed.). Catholic Encyclopedia. Vol. 2. New York: Robert Appleton Company.
- Tabbernee, William, ed. (2014). Early Christianity in Contexts: An Exploration across Cultures and Continents. Baker Academic. ISBN 9781441245717.

=== Further reading ===
- Laffi, Umberto. Colonie e municipi nello Stato romano Ed. di Storia e Letteratura. Roma, 2007 ISBN 8884983509
- Mommsen, Theodore. The Provinces of the Roman Empire Section: Roman Africa. (Leipzig 1865; London 1866; London: Macmillan 1909; reprint New York 1996) Barnes & Noble. New York, 1996
- Smyth Vereker, Charles. Scenes in the Sunny South: Including the Atlas Mountains and the Oases of the Sahara in Algeria. Volume 2. Publisher Longmans, Green, and Company. University of Wisconsin. Madison,1871 (Roman Hippo Regius)
