= Calama (Numidia) =

Colonia in the Roman province of Numidia

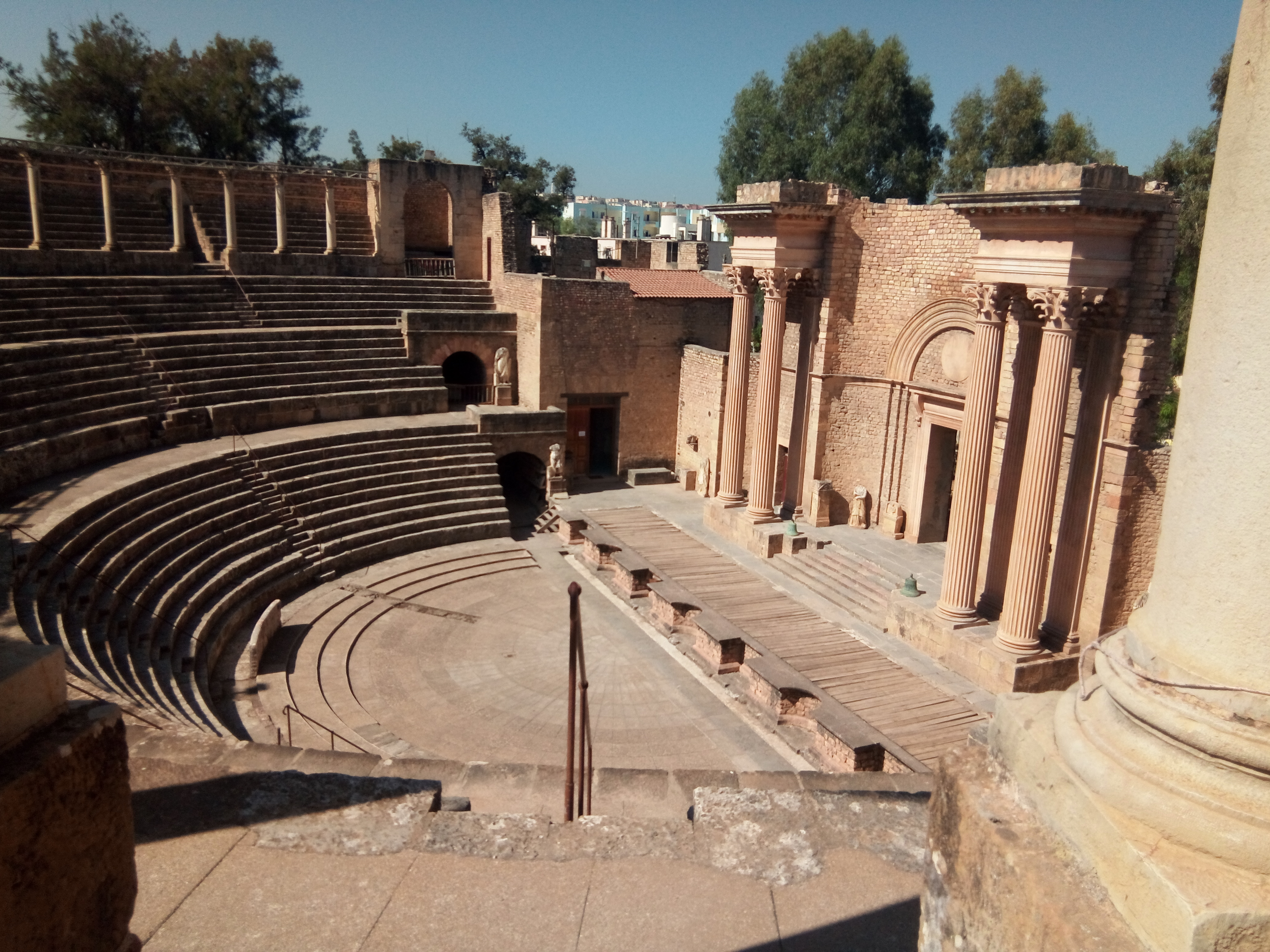
- The Roman theatre of Calama

- Location within Algeria
- 36.467313°N 7.430052°E
- Location: Algeria
- Region: Guelma Province

Calama was a colonia in the Roman province of Numidia situated where Guelma in Algeria now stands.

G. Mokhtar places it just within the Roman province of Africa Proconsularis, to the east of Numidia, but it is generally believed to have been in Numidia, a province created probably in 198–199.

== History ==
Calama was founded by the Phoenicians and called Malaka, similar to their colony Malake (Punic: 𐤌𐤋𐤊𐤀, mlkʾ) at Málaga, Spain. Malaka was situated in the Berber kingdom of Numidia. When this area later came under Roman rule, the city was renamed Calama. Between the late republic and early empire, it was governed by a Punic-inspired twin magistracy of sufetes.

Whether Calama is identical with the town of Suthul which the Roman general Aulus Postumius Albinus unsuccessfully tried to take in 110 BC, (cf. Battle of Suthul) is disputed, with some denying it and others cautiously affirming it.

In the 1st century AD, Calama, then part of the Roman province of Numidia, became a major urban centre. It was given the rank of a Roman municipium as early as Hadrian, and of a colonia later. The city was sponsored by Vibia Aurelia Sabina, sister of the Emperor Commodus (late 2nd century). Calama was, with Setifis (Setif) and Hippo Regius (Annaba), one of the granaries of Rome in the 2nd and 3rd centuries AD. Under Septimius Severus, Calama became one of the most prosperous cities in the Roman empire, with thermae and a huge theatre.

Calama became a Christian bishopric, four of whose bishops are named in extant documents:

- Donatus (not to be confused with Donatus Magnus) was accused in a council held in 305 of having handed over the sacred scriptures during the Decian persecution
- Megalius gave episcopal ordination to Saint Augustine in 395 and died in 397
- Saint Possidius, elected in the year of Megalius's death, took an active part in the joint Conference of Carthage (411) with Donatist bishops
- Quodvultdeus was one of the Catholic bishops whom Huneric summoned to Carthage in 484 and then exiled.

Possidius wrote the first biography of Augustine, in which he lets it be known that he himself was one of the clergy of Augustine's monastery when he was appointed bishop of Calama. When Calama fell into the hands of the Vandal king Genseric in 429, Possidius took refuge with Augustine within the walled city of Hippo Regius. He was present at Augustine's death in 430.

No longer a residential bishopric, Calama is today listed by the Catholic Church as a titular see.

The invading Vandals captured and partially destroyed Calama and defeated Count Bonifacius near the city in 431.

After the conquest of Numidia by the Byzantine Empire, Solomon (a general of Justinian I) built a fortress there between 539 and 554. Calama's population was fully Christian in the 6th and 7th century.

With the spread of Islam, Byzantine rule of Calama ended (some Christians survived until the 9th century) and slowly Calama disappeared around the 11th century (see Guelma).

=== Archeological remains ===
- Theatre. It is difficult to reconstruct the plan and general appearance of the Roman theatre. The only other important monument discovered are the public baths. The theatre was built in the first or second year of the 3rd century AD through the generosity of a certain Annia Aelia Restituta, who spent 400,000 sesterces on it. It was restored, indeed virtually rebuilt, from 1902 to 1918, after having served as a quarry. It is on a slope and measures 58.05 metres (190.5 ft) in width, with a stage 37 metres (121 ft) wide and 7.15 metres (23.5 ft) deep. It was built with a rubble core revetted with ashlar. The tiers of seats had virtually all disappeared; they must have numbered 10 in the lower zone and 12 in the second. The orchestra was paved in marble. The edge of the stage (pulpitum) is decorated with seven niches, alternately square and semi-circular, whose sculptures have disappeared. The stage wall was divided by three semi-circular niches. The central niche surrounded by a column is pierced by a door, while the side niches are closed, contrary to architectural custom, and are decorated with statues.

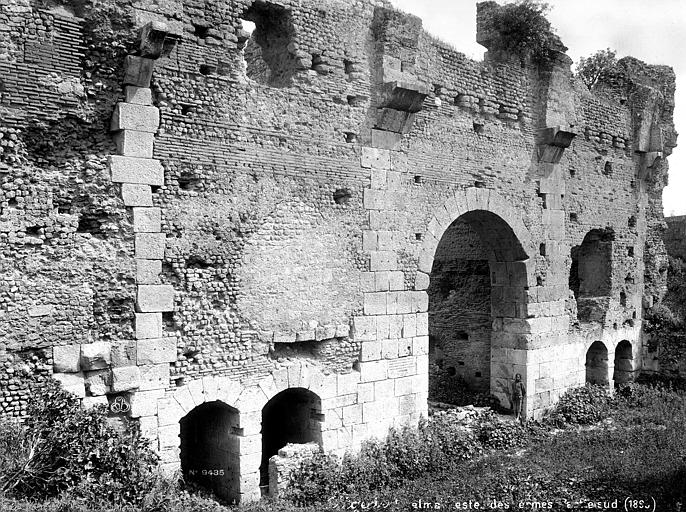
Roman thermae of Calama

- Baths. The public Roman baths were built of rubble and revetted with ashlar and brick. These "thermae" may date as early as the 2nd century AD. Only one large rectangular chamber (22 by 14 metres [72 ft × 46 ft]), undoubtedly the tepidarium, can be described; it gave onto other rooms and onto the exterior by 11 passages. These baths were included within the Byzantine fortress, no doubt built on an earlier enclosure and defended by 13 towers. It measured 278 by 219 metres (912 ft × 719 ft).
- Forum. The existence of a forum is attested by a single inscription. There are also remains of arcades, a small shrine of Neptune, cisterns and, outside the town, a Christian church. In 1953 a hoard of 7,499 coins was discovered; virtually all of them came from the mint at Rome; the most recent dated to the beginning of AD 257. Presumably the hoard was buried because of local disturbances. Most of the ancient objects recovered at Calama and from the region are preserved in the Guelma Museum.
- Citadel and walls. Among its ruins are also a Byzantine citadel and walls built by the Byzantine patricius Solomon during the Byzantine reoccupation.
