= Byzantine Sardinia =

History of Sardinia under Byzantine rule (534–11th century)

Sardigna
- 534–11th century
- Capital: Caralis
- Common languages: Sardinian
- Religion: Christianity
- Historical era: Early Middle Ages
  - Established: 534
  - Disestablished: 11th century
Preceded by	Succeeded by
Vandal Sardinia; Exarchate of Africa	Sardinian medieval kingdoms

The Byzantine age in Sardinian history conventionally begins with the island's reconquest by Justinian I in 534. This ended the Vandal dominion of the island after about 80 years. There was still a substantial continuity with the Roman phase at this time.

== History ==
=== Origin ===
Sardinia was reconquered by the Byzantine empire during the Vandalic War for possession of Africa. Having defeated the Vandals in Africa at the Battle of Tricamarum, and having victory in hand, the Byzantine general Belisarius sent general Cyril to Sardinia with a fleet to subdue it.

[Belisario] immediately sent Cyril with the chief of Zazone and many soldiers to Sardinia, since the islanders, fearful of the Vandals and still not sure of what had happened near Tricamaro [the Vandal defeat], refused to obey. to Justinian. ... Cyril then landed in Sardinia, and exposed Zazone's head in a public place, honorably managed to reduce the two islands [Sardinia and Corsica] tributaries of the empire as they once were.

Emperor Justinian established that Sardinia were constituted as a ducatus (duchy) within the Exarchate of Africa.

From this [prefecture], with the help of God, seven provinces with their judges will depend, of which Zeugi, which was previously called Proconsular Carthage, Byzacium and Tripoli will have consulares as governors; while the others, namely Numidia, Mauritania and Sardinia will be, with the help of God, governed by praesides".

Despite the new establishment, the Byzantines could not pacify the Barbaricini, who had control of the interior of the isle. So, in the decade of 530, the magister militum per Africam Solomon sent some duces to Sardinia to fight against them. The dux of Sardinia, who had the task of fighting against the Barbaricini, had his residence in the mountains of Barbagia, where this people lived, reluctant to allow themselves to be subjugated. Precisely the dux's seat was the Forum Traiani, the walls of which were rebuilt at the behest of Justinian.

=== Barbarian Invasions ===
In the year 551, the Ostrogothic king Totila invaded the island and occupied it. The magister militum per Africam, John Troglita attempted to recover it, but was defeated by the Goths

Now, Totila desired to seize the islands belonging to Libya. He therefore immediately assembled a fleet of ships, and, putting on board a suitable army, sent it to Corsica and Sardinia. This fleet first sailed towards Corsica and, finding no defenders, took the island and then also took possession of Sardinia. And Totila subjected both islands to paying tribute. But when John, who commanded the Roman army in Libya, heard about this, he sent a fleet of ships and a strong army of soldiers to Sardinia. And when they were near the city of Caralis, they camped to lay siege; but they did not believe themselves capable of assaulting the walls, since the Goths had a sufficient garrison there. When the barbarians heard of this, they made a sortie against them from the city and, suddenly falling upon their enemies, defeated them without difficulty and killed many of them.

However, after the defeat of Totila and Teia (552) and the submission of the Goths, Sardinia was recovered by the Empire.

The invasion of the Italian Peninsula by the Longobards in 568, which changed the face of Italy, only resulted in a few coastal raids on Sardinia, even if there are traces of their presence on the island, documented by the discovery of various objects, including numerous coins. A failed Longobard invasion affected Cagliari in 599, but it was repelled.

=== Time of Pope Gregory I ===
During the pontificate of Pope Gregory I (590-604), Sardinia was included within the Roman sphere, participating in the work of protection, administration and evangelization of this pontiff. He wrote numerous letters dedicated to Sardinian dignitaries. Those letters are the richest documentation preserved about this time. They shown the continued division of Sardinia into a Romanized zone (coasts and coastal cities, plain) and a still barbaric internal region, Barbagia. Pope Gregory I worked to convert these inland populations to Christianity by sending letters and emissaries. In particular, he sent Dux Zabarda who in 594 stipulated a pact with the leader of the Barbaricini named Hospito.

In 595, Gregory sent a bishop to Sardinia to continue the mission of conversion. It was discovered that the Iudex Provinciae of Sardinia, in order to recover the money lost to purchase the governorship, was allowing pagans to continue worshiping their idols in exchange for paying a tax:

Learning that many of the natives of Sardinia still... make sacrifices to idols..., I sent one of the bishops of Italy, who... converted many of the natives. But he told me that... those who sacrifice idols on the island pay a tax to the governor of the province for doing so. And, when some were baptized and stopped making sacrifices to idols, the said governor of the island continued to demand payment of the tax... And, when said bishop spoke with him, he responded that he had promised him a suffrage. so great that I would not have been able to pay it if I had not acted in this way... I suspect that such misdeeds have not reached your most pious ears, because if they had, they would not have continued to this point. day at all. But it is time for Our Most Pious Lord [the Emperor] to find out about this, so that he can remove such a serious burden of guilt from his soul, from the Empire and from his children. I know that you will say that what is withdrawn from these islands is used in the expenses of the armies for their defense; but perhaps this is the reason for the little benefit they obtain from such collections, since they are taken from others and not without an admixture of guilt.

=== 7th Century ===
A Theodorus is mentioned as the praeses eiusdem Sardiniae in a letter of Pope Honorius I dated June 10, 627, in which Honorius describes Theodorus preventing the clergy of Cagliari from sailing to Rome on Honorius' summons and instead redirecting them to Africa, and asks the praetorian prefect of Africa Gregorius to punish Theodorus and send the clergy to Rome as requested.

=== Muslim raids ===
In 806-807, the Moors from Spain attempted an incursion in Sardinia, which were blocked and the invasors suffered serious losses. According to the chronicler Einhard, 3,000 men fell in battle.

In 810, Sardinia and Corsica were attacked by Moors from all Spain (Mauri de tota Hispania), en route for Corsica, which they took as it was undefended. Two years later a fleet coming from Africa and Spain to ravage Italy split into two parts, and the part which was brought to Sardinia was nearly wiped out.

Moorish pirates also established some bases in Sardinia. They used Tavolara Island as base for a major attack on Rome in 845.

=== Archontate ===
After the fall of Carthage to the Arabs, Sardinia was an autonomous archontate of the Byzantine Empire ruled by a Judex or Judge. The Archonate lasted until its fragmentation during the first half of the eleventh century, when it was replaced by two Sardinian medieval kingdoms – the Judicates of Torres and Cagliari. The Judicate of Cagliari had institutional continuity with the Archontate era, having a locally elected Judge who reported back to Constantinople as an Archon between 533 and 1015, and acted as an independent administrator between 1015 and 1258. In 1073, when the records improved, four kingdoms are recorded (Torres, Calari, Gallura and Arborea).

In 815, ambassadors from Sardinia went to the Carolingian Empire, with gifts to Emperor Louis the Pious, possibly to request military assistance against the Arab attacks. Later, in 829, the Count Bonifacio (Carolingian feudal lord in charge of defense of Corsica) arrived in Sardinia, searching for help from Sardinian authorities for his counterattack of the Arab pirates in the African coasts.

From the mid-9th century, the popes interacted with the supreme ruler in Sardinia called the iudex ('judge'). So it was the letter of Pope Leo IV (847– 55) to the iudex of Sardinia:

"[...] to the iudex of Sardinia. We have thought to beg your highness to deign to send us, as many as your magnificence sees fit, Sardinians, adults or young men with their weapons, who might be able to carry out for us every day orders."

Later pontifical letters until the eleventh century would show the gradual reduction of the institutional and political importance of the iudices in the eyes of the popes. Byzantium ceased to send military officials to Sardinia after the middle of the ninth century. It is possible that, after the start of the Aghlabid conquest of Sicily in 827, the Byzantine army was regionalised, and that some noble family of Sardinia had assumed the title of Iudices Sardiniae, in accordance with the provisions of Justinian I, and also claimed the military power of the dux. From the pontifical letters of Pope Nicholas I (858–67) and John VIII to Sardinia, it isn't clear if the island was divided at this point or a central authority remained in the island, but an increasing consensus saw that a supreme ruler of Sardinia (the archon) had supremacy over local principes as local archontes.

The Byzantium Emperor Constantine VII named the ruler of Sardinia (a nominal and autonomous vassal at this time) as archon in his book De Cerimoniis (956–959 AD). He also mentioned the existence of Sardinian imperial guards:

To the archon of Sardinia, a two-solidi gold seal. Mandate from the Christ-loving ruler to the archon of Sardinia. To the duke of Venice; to the prince of Capua; to the prince of Salerno; to the duke of Naples; to the archon of Amalfi; to the archon of Gaeta.

The archontate is also attested in local inscriptions in churches from the end of the tenth century (naming some archons as Torchotorio and Salousio) and some seals from the period.

Lord, help the servants of God and our most noble archontes Torchoutorio, imperial (proto) spatharios, and Salousio our most noble archontes. Amen. Remember, Lord, also your servant Ortzokor. Amen.

At this time the relations with Byzantium, if not completely interrupted, had become intermittent. The archon of Sardinia (named 'lord of the island of Sardinia') sent an envoy to conclude a peace treaty with the Caliph of Cordoba Abd al-Rahman III in the year 942. Contacts between Sardinia and Byzantium are attested as later as 1006, when envoys of the emperor Basil II arrived at the port of Medinaceli with some Andalusi sailors who had been captured on the Sardinian and Corsican coasts. The envoys invited the caliph to forbid the piracy and to respect previous friendship treaties.

=== The Invasion of Mujahid of Dénia ===
In the years 1015 and 1016, the ruler of the taifa of Dénia, Mujahid al-Amiri, launched a major invasion of Sardinia, intending to conquer it. The local Sardinian ruler, Salusio (or Malut/Malik) was killed in a bloody battle and the organised resistance broke down. Muhajid ruled the isle for a year and only a joint expeditions from the maritime Republic of Pisa and Genoa repelled the invaders.

The invasion had great repercussions for Sardinia and it is possible that it provoked the final fragmentation of the Sardinian archontate. So in the middle of the eleventh century, Sardinia left the Byzantine political orbit and went into the sphere of the Latin West. The four "judges", Torres, Cagliari, Arborea, and Gallura, appeared soon as independent kingdoms. Its first unequivocal attestation of four separate kingdoms in Sardinia is the letter sent on October 14, 1073 by Pope Gregory VII (1073–1085) to Orzocco of Cagliari, Orzocco d'Arborea, Marianus of Torres, and Constantine of Gallura.

During the early Giudicati era, the Judicate of Cagliari was a direct descendant of the former Archontate of Sardinia. It helped many Byzantine institutions, including the Byzantine Greek language, to survive. By the end of the century Greek had been supplanted by Medieval Latin and Sardinian.

Since the second half of the eleventh century and for the next century, the rulers of the four judicates tried to establish themselves institutionally as kings (reges) ruling over kingdoms (regna). Their efforts were frustrated by the Papacy, which was enforcing its Gregorian Reforms and claimed for itself the right to determine who was king in the Latin West.

== Administration ==
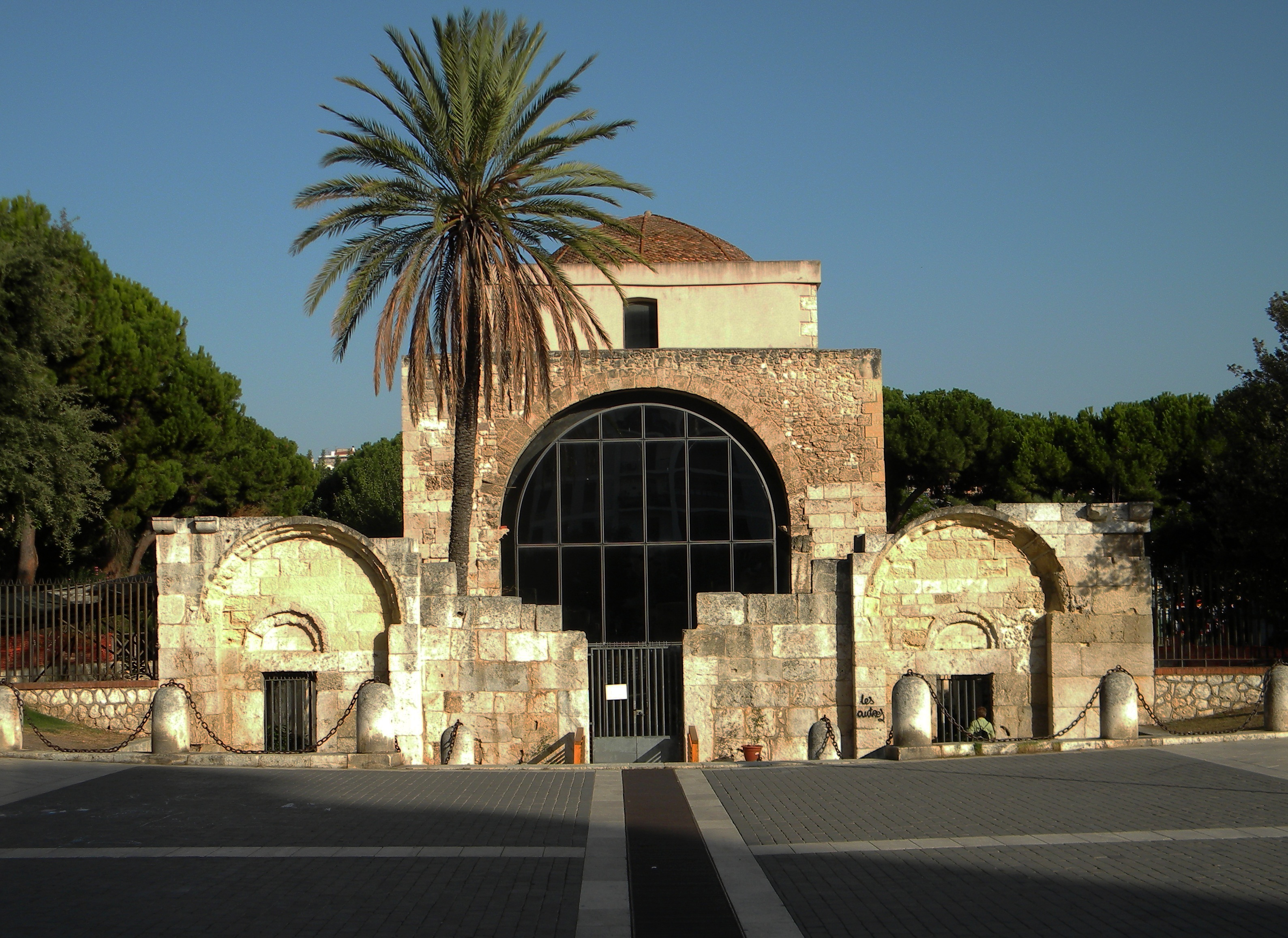
Basilica of San Saturnino, Cagliari

The Byzantine Empire was an autocratic state, with its administration centralised around the Emperor. In addition to being the chief of the army he also had authority in the Church, often appointing the Ecumenical Patriarch. Following the Byzantine reconquest, Sardinia was part of the Praetorian prefecture of Africa. The province of Sardinia was ruled by a praeses provinciae, also known as the iudex provinciae, based in Cagliari. A dux was responsible for military matters and was based at Fordongianus (Forum Traiani), which since Roman times had been a fortified bastion against the inhabitants of the Barbagia. These two most important offices, iudex and dux, were unified in the 7th century. To allow for control of the routes that crossed the Tyrrhenian Sea, the island was also home to a squadron of the Byzantine fleet.

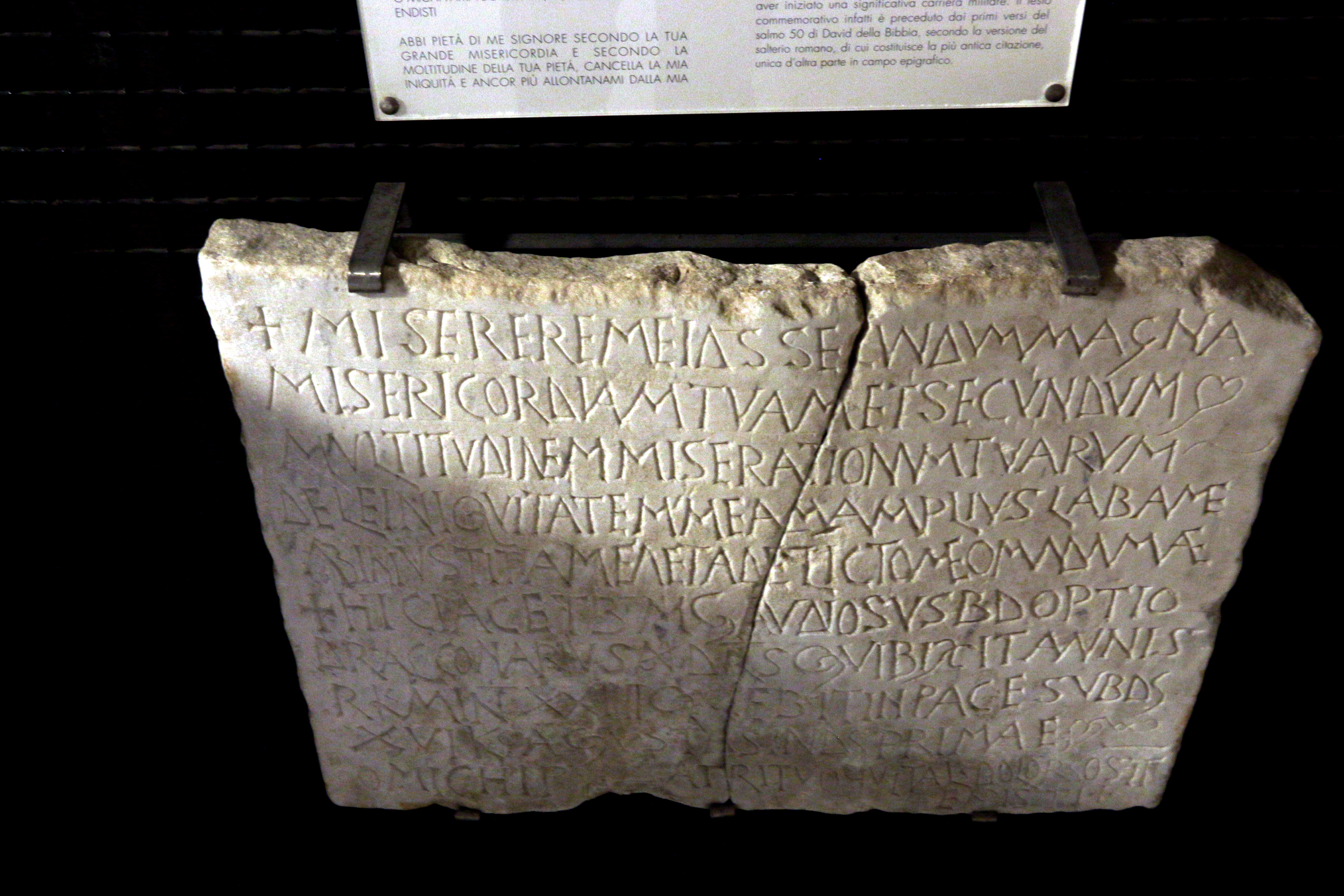
Funerary inscription of Gaudiosus, officer of the Byzantine army, died in the 6th century at 24 years old and buried near the Basilica of San Saturnino in Cagliari

Units of the Byzantine field army, the comitatenses, were based at Fordongianus. Along the border with the Barbagia region were fortresses such as those at Austis, Samugheo, Nuragus and Armungia. Soldiers of different origins (Germanic peoples, Balkan peoples, Longobards and Avars among others), called limitanei (border troops), were garrisoned here. Some of the island's garrison soldiers were caballarii (horsemen) and received in compensation for their military services land parcels to farm.

In the countryside there continued to be the great estates, but also smaller properties and common lands. The rural population consisted of both free people (the possessors) and slaves, mostly living in villages (vici). They worked the private and community lands with hoes and nail plows, grazed livestock and fished. Extensive vineyards were cultivated but there seemed to have been few orchards.

=== Evolution of the administration ===
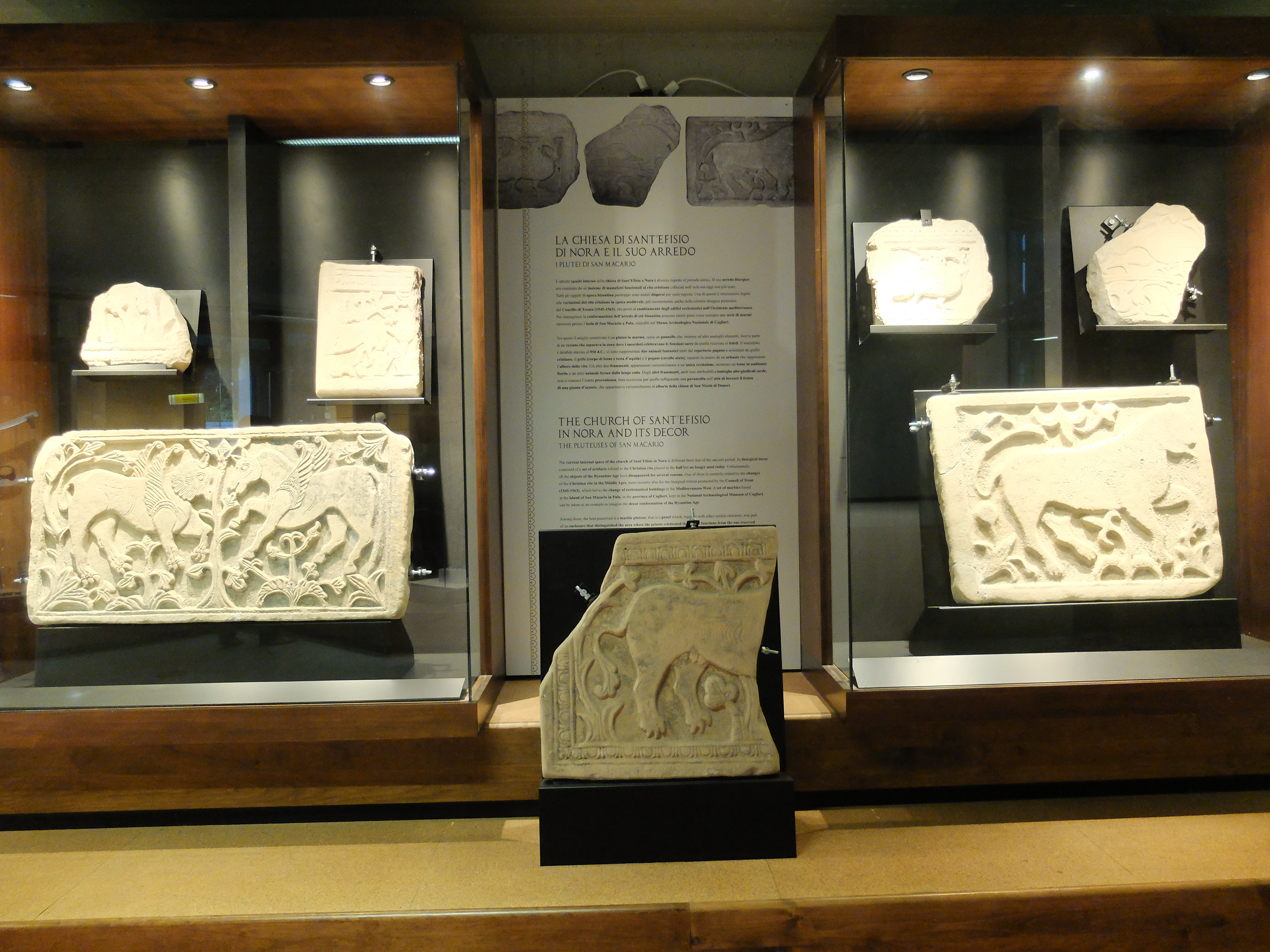
Pluteuses from the San Macario Island (Pula). National Archaeological Museum, Cagliari

After the fall of the African Exarchate in the 7th century, caused by the Arab conquest of Carthage, the ducatus was directly dependent on Constantinople.

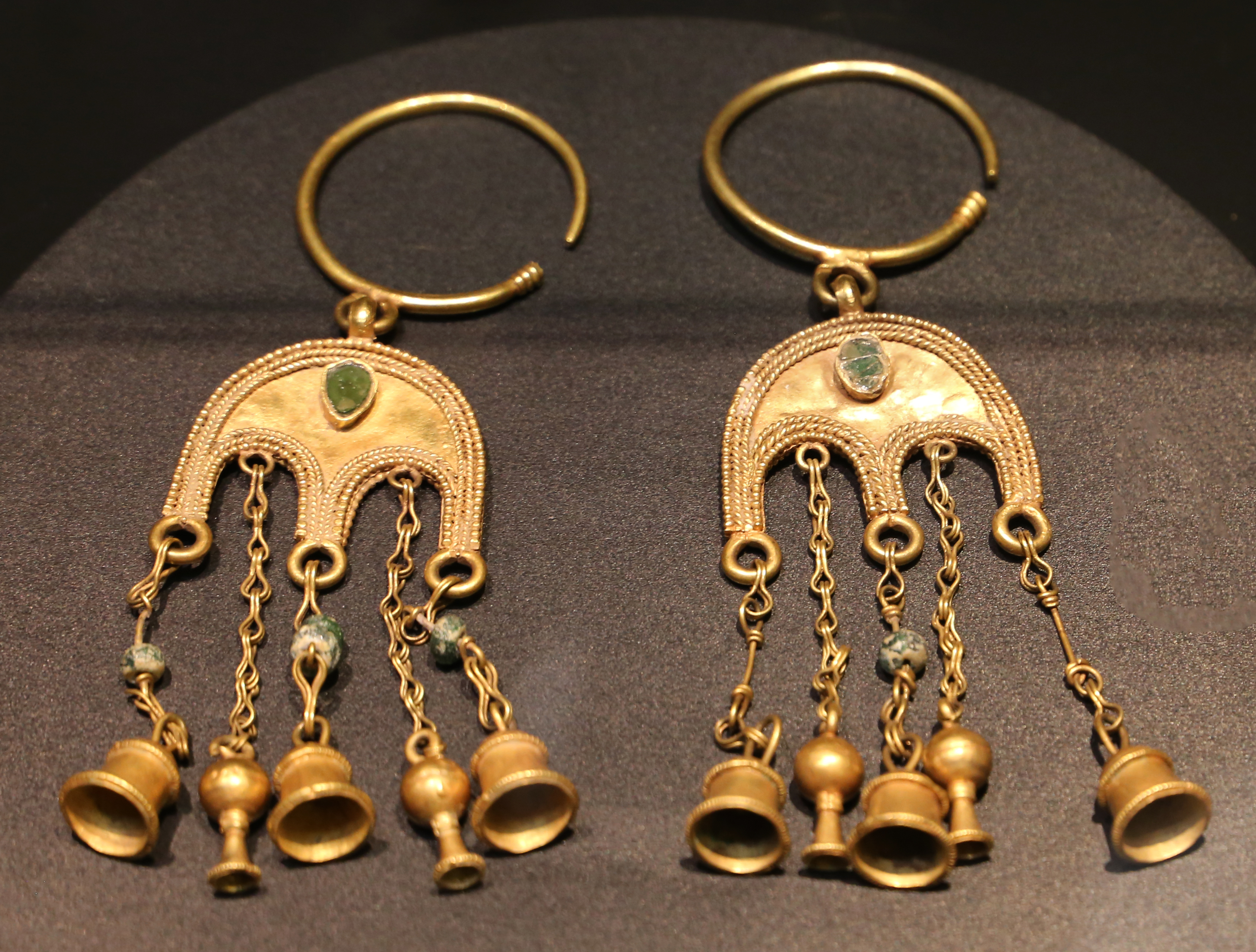
Gold earrings from Bruncu e' s'Olia-Dolianova. National Archaeological Museum, Cagliari

It became then an archontate; that is, a region with the same characteristics of a theme but smaller and less rich. The governors of the island originally held the rank of hypatos and later that of protospatharios, before receiving the title of patrikios from the middle of the ninth century. Due to Saracen attacks, in the 9th century Tharros was abandoned in favor of Oristano, after more than 1,800 years of human occupation while Caralis was abandoned in favor of Santa Igia. Numerous other coastal centres suffered the same fate (Nora, Sulci, Bithia, Cornus, Bosa, and Olbia among others).

The Sardinian archon had both military and civil functions. During the period of direct Byzantine rule, these were delegated to two different officers, the dux and the praeses. The office of archon became the prerogative of a specific family who transmitted the title in succession from father to a son. At the beginning of the 11th century there was a single archon for the whole island. This situation changed over the following decades.

== Religion ==
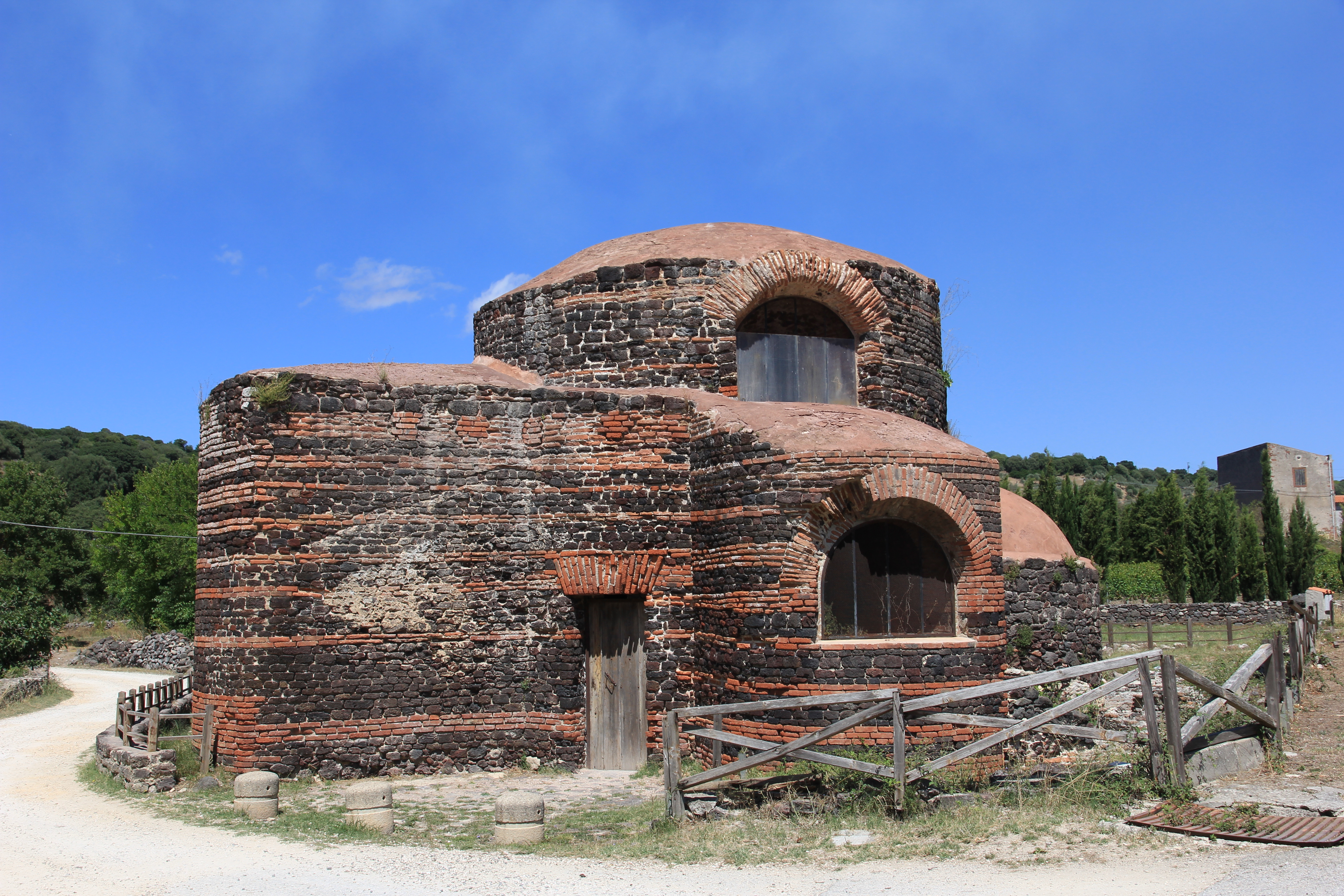
Church of Nostra Segnora de Mesumundu, Siligo

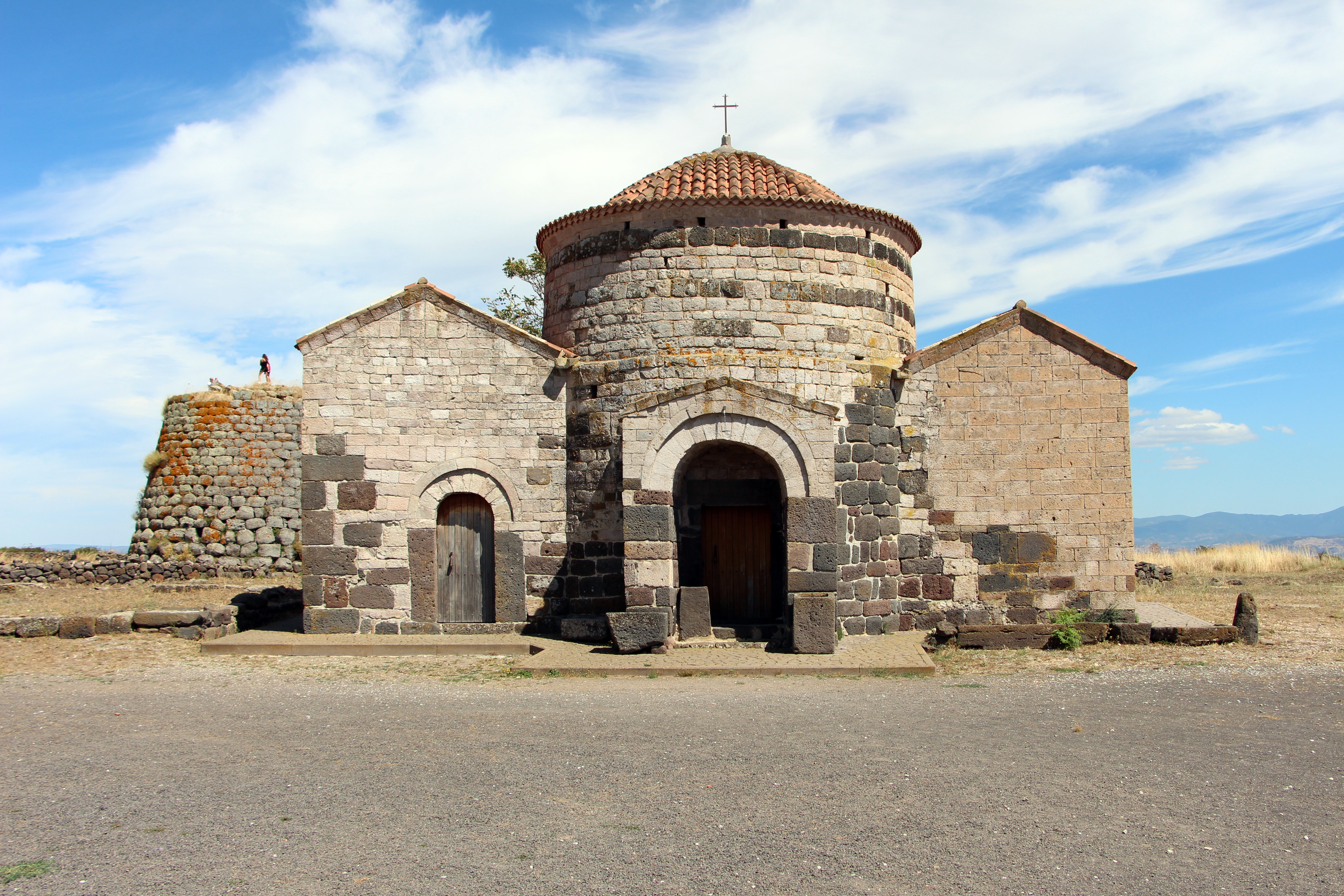
Church of Santa Sabina in front of the homonym nuraghe, Silanus

The Sardinian Church followed the Eastern Rite, in which baptism and confirmation were imparted together. Baptism was carried out by submersion in tanks where water came to the knees of the catechumens. Similar baptismal tanks are found in Tharros, Dolianova, Nurachi, Cornus and Fordongianus. Alongside the secular clergy operated the Basilian monks, who spread Christianity in Barbagia.

In the Byzantine period several cross-in-square churches were erected, with the four arms around a domed roof over their junction.

== Chronology ==
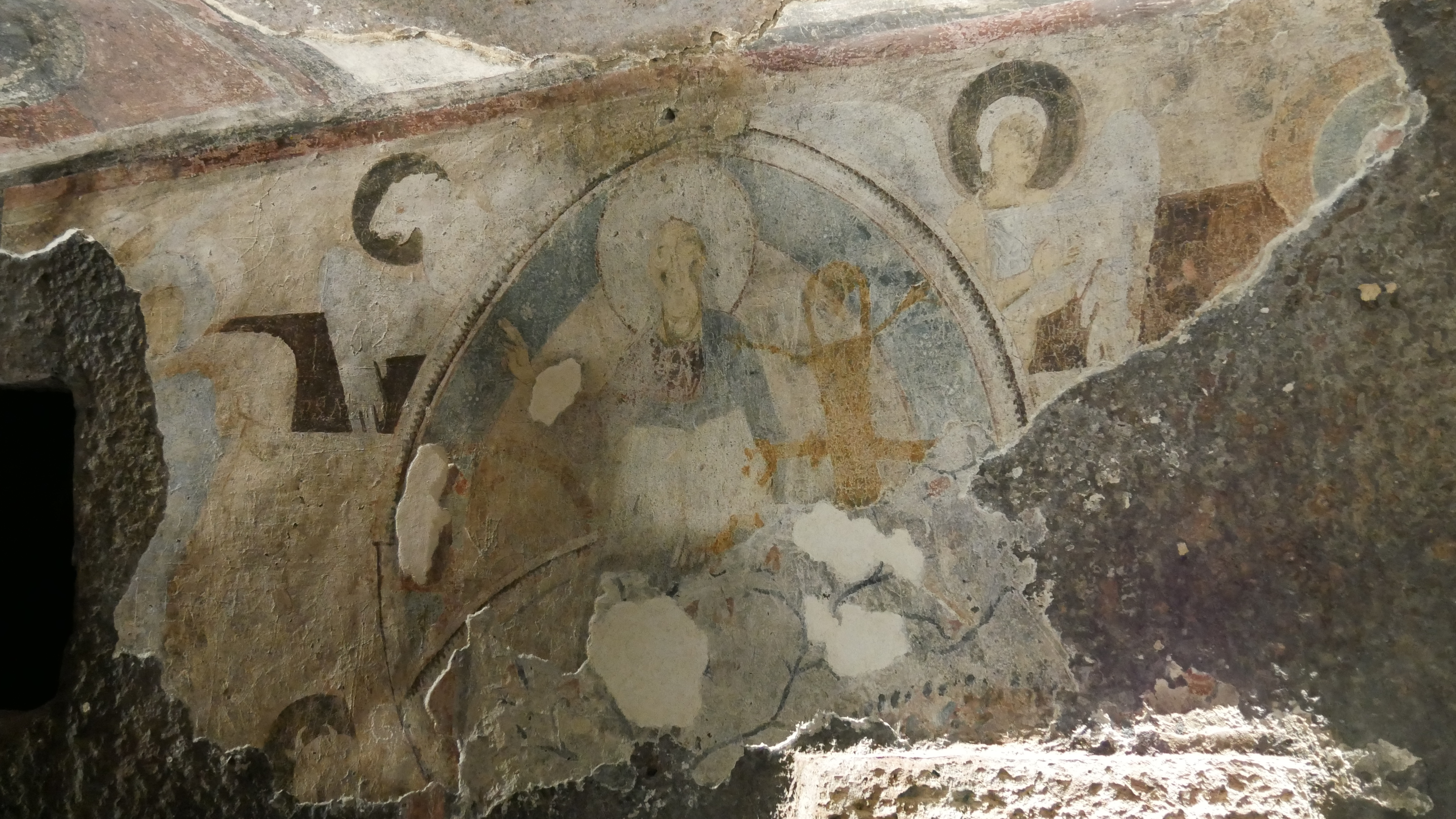
Byzantine era fresco from the necropolis of Sant'Andrea Priu, Bonorva

- 534 Conquest of Sardinia by Justinian
- 551-552 Very short occupation of Sardinia by the Ostrogoths of Totila during the Gothic War.
- 565–578 Justin II succeeds Justinian I. Better tax policy.
- 590–604 Pontificate of Pope Gregory I. Letter to the dux Barbaricinorum Hospito for the conversion of the Barbagians.
- 594 Peace between the Byzantines and the Barbagians.
- 599 A Longobard attack on the coast of Cagliari is defeated.
- 603 The papal envoy Vitale is commissioned by the Sardinians to go to Emperor Phocas to demand a reduction in the tax burden.
- 642 Beginning of the Muslim conquest of North Africa.
- 674–678 First Arab Siege of Constantinople
- 698 The conquest of Carthage is a decisive date for the occupation of North-West Africa by the Umayyads; start of the Islamization of that region.
- 705–753 Arab raids
- 827 The Aghlabid begin the conquest of Sicily. this event is probably relevant with the de facto separation of Sardinia from the Byzantine empire.
- 934 Massive raid from the North Africa Fatimids.
- 947 Peace treaty between the Byzantine Empire and the Umayyad Caliphate of Spain.
- 1015-16 Attempted conquest of the island by Mujāhid al-Amirī. The Pisano-Genoese expeditions to Sardinia repelled the attack.

== Bibliography ==
- Bruce, Travis (2006), "The Politics of Violence and Trade: Denia and Pisa in the Eleventh Century" (PDF), Journal of Medieval History, 32 (2): 127–42, doi:10.1016/j.jmedhist.2006.04.004, S2CID 154206387.

=== English ===
- Consentino, Salvatore. "Byzantine Sardinia between West and East". Millennium: Jahrbuch zu Kultur und Geschichte des ersten Jahrtausends n. Chr. 1 (2004): 329–67.
- Contu, Giuseppe. "Sardinia in Arabic Sources". AnnalSS 3 (2003): 287–97.
- Dyson, Stephen L., and Rowland, Robert J. Archaeology and History in Sardinia from the Stone Age to the Middle Ages: Shepherds, Sailors, and Conquerors. Philadelphia: University of Pennsyolvania Museum of Archaeology and Anthropology, 2007.
- Galoppini, Laura. "Overview of Sardinia History (500–1500)", pp. 85–114. In Michalle Hobart (ed.), A Companion to Sardinian History, 500–1500. Leiden: Brill, 2017.
- Kaegi, Walter Emil. "Gightis and Olbia in the Pseudo-Methodius Apocalypse and Their Significance". Byzantinische Forschungen 26 (2000): 161–67.
- Kaegi, Walter Emil. "Byzantine Sardinia and Africa Face the Muslims: Seventh-Century Evidence". Bizantinistica 3 (2001): 1–25.
- Kaegi, Walter Emil. "Byzantine Sardinia Threatened: Its Changing Situation in the Seventh Century", pp. 43–56. In Paola Corrias (ed.), Forme e Caratteri della presenza bizantina: la Sardegna (secoli VI–XI). Condaghes, 2012.
- Rowland, Robert J. The Periphery in the Center: Sardinia in the Ancient and Medieval Worlds. Oxford: Archaeopress, 2001.

=== Italian ===
- Casula, Francesco Cesare (1994). La Storia di Sardegna. Sassari: Delfino.
- Gian Giacomo Ortu, La Sardegna dei Giudici, Il Maestrale, Nuoro 2005.
- Paola Corrias (ed.), Forme e Caratteri della presenza bizantina: la Sardegna (secoli VI–XI), Condaghes, 2012.
- Giorgio Ravegnani, I Bizantini in Italia, Bologna, il Mulino, 2004.
- Storia della marineria bizantina, a cura di Antonio Carile, Salvatore Cosentino, Editrice Lo Scarabeo, Bologna, 2004, ISBN 88-8478-064-0
- Pier Giorgio Spanu, La Sardegna bizantina tra VI e VII secolo, S'Alvure, Oristano, 1998.
- Letizia Pani Ermini, La Sardegna nel periodo vandalico, in AA. VV. Storia dei Sardi e della Sardegna, a cura di Massimo Guidetti, vol. I Dalle origini alla fine dell'età bizantina, Jaca Book, Milano, 1987, pagg. 297–327
- André Guillou, La lunga età bizantina: politica ed economia e La diffusione della cultura bizantina, in AA. VV. Storia dei Sardi e della Sardegna cit., pag. 329–423
- Giuseppe Meloni, Il Condaghe di San Gavino: un documento unico sulla nascita dei giudicati, Cagliari, CUEC, 2005. ISBN 8884672805.
- Giulio Paulis, Lingua e cultura nella Sardegna Bizantina, Sassari, 1983;
- Alberto Boscolo, La Sardegna bizantina e alto-giudicale, Sassari, Chiarella 1978;
- Victor Leontovitsch, Elementi di collegamento fra le istituzioni di diritto pubblico della Sardegna medioevale ed il diritto pubblico dell'Impero bizantino, in "Medioevo. Saggi e rassegne", 3, Cagliari, 1977, pagg. 9–26
- Piras P.G., Aspetti della Sardegna bizantina, Cagliari, 1966.
