= Saltaro of Gallura =

Saltaro was the Judge of Gallura, located on the northeastern section of Sardinia, but the dates of his reign are unknown, as are his familial ties.

He made a donation of Vitithe to the Church of Pisa which was confirmed in 1116 by Ittocorre. The charter calls him encus mortuus est, idest sine haeredibus ("already dead, without heirs"). He may have been a son and successor of Constantine I and predecessor of Torchitorio. He may have belonged to the Lacon, Thori, or Gherardeschi families. Some sources make him a son of Torchitorio and place his reign in the early twelfth century immediately before Ittocorre's. However, it is more likely that he ruled before or after Manfred and Baldo in the early eleventh century.

== Sources ==
- Manno, Giuseppe (1835). Storia di Sardegna. P.M. Visaj.
