= Baldo of Gallura =

Baldo was the Judge of Gallura during the time of Comita I of Torres. He succeeded Manfred and both were probably Pisan clients.

Comita made war on Baldo, defeated him, and captured him. His successor is not known with certainty. It was probably Constantine I, but was perhaps Saltaro.

== Sources ==
- Manno, Giuseppe (1835). Storia di Sardegna. P.M. Visaj.

| Preceded by Manfred | Judge of Gallura c. 1040 – c. 1060 | Succeeded by Constantine I |
