= Ittocorre of Gallura =

Ittocorre or Ottocorre was the Judge of Gallura early in the 12th century. He is first mentioned in a donation charter of Padules de Gunale, the widow of Torchitorio de Zori in 1112, from which it is inferred that he succeeded Torchitorio as judge around the start of the 12th century.

By a Pisan charter dated 8 May 1117 (corresponding to 1116), Ittocorre donated the four Gallurese churches of Torpeia, Toraie, Vignolas, and Laratanos to the church of Pisa. He also confirmed a donation of Vitithe made by his predecessor Saltaro. He is surnamed de Gunale in the document and he may have been a brother of Padulesa, who, it is written, had already donated her portions of ownership in the churches. Before the marriage of Padulesa and Torchitorio, the Gunale and Zori families were enemies and Ittocorre appears to have been an enemy of the Zori as late as 1112.

Ittocorre only appears in two more charters, one confirming another donation to the Pisan church by Padulesa and another wherein he declared fidelity to the Archdiocese of Pisa.

After his brief stint in the judgeship, Ittocorre appears with the title of donnu, the second-highest post in the giudicato. Ittocorre left an unnamed daughter. No successor of his is known, except probably Comita, until Constantine III, who may have been his son.

== Sources ==
- Manno, Giuseppe (1835). Storia di Sardegna. P.M. Visaj.

| Preceded by Torchitorio | Judge of Gallura c. 1100 – c. 1116 | Succeeded by Comita |
