= Constantine III of Gallura =

Constantine III

Judge/King of Gallura
- Reign: 1146-1161
- Predecessor: Comita Spanu
- Successor: Barisone
- Died: 1172 or 1173
- Spouse: Anastasia/Elena of Arborea
- Issue: Barisone, King of Gallura
Names
- Constantine de Lacon-Gunale
- House: Lacon-Gunale
- Father: Ittocorre, King of Gallura

Constantine III (died between 1171 and 1173), possibly a son of Ittocorre, succeeded Comita Spanu as giudice of Gallura (northern Sardinia) in 1146 and reigned until 1161, when he retired from the world as a monk. He was the first Gallurese ruler of the Lacon dynasty and was characterised by "nobility of mind."

During a time of siege he was forced to take refuge with his relatives in Arborea. He married Elena de Lacon, daughter of Comita III of Arborea, granting her San Felice di Vada in Iurifai as a bridal gift. His second wife was Sardinia. He was succeeded by his son Barisone II.

== Sources ==
- Caravale, Mario (ed). Dizionario Biografico degli Italiani: XXVII Collenuccio – Confortini. Rome, 1982.
- Manno, Giuseppe (1835). Storia di Sardegna. P.M. Visaj.

Preceded by Comita	Giudice of Gallura; 1146 – 1161	Succeeded by Barisone II
