= Judge of Gallura =

The Giudicati of Sardinia.

The kings or judges (iudices or judikes) of Gallura were the local rulers of the northeast of Sardinia during the Middle Ages. Theirs was the closest kingdom to Corsica.

- Manfred (c. 1020 – c. 1040)
- Baldo (c. 1040 – c. 1065)
- Constantine I (c. 1065 – c. 1080)
- Saltaro (c. 1080)
- Torchitorio (c. 1080 – c. 1100)
- Ittocorre (c. 1100 – 1116)
- Constantine II (1116 – c. 1133)
- Comita (c. 1133 – 1146)
- Constantine III (1146 – c. 1170)
- Barisone II (c. 1170 – 1203)
- Elena (1203–1218)
- Lambert (1207–1225)
- Ubaldo (1225–1238)
- John (1238–1275)
- Nino (1275–1296)
- Joanna (1296–1308)
