= Constantine I of Gallura =

Constantine I was the Giudice of Gallura from probably before 1065 to sometime before 1100. He was probably a member of the Gherardeschi family of Pisa and governed Gallura on behalf of the Republic.

Constantine was alive in 1073 and a letter of Pope Gregory VII dated 1074. Constantine took part in the early infusion of Western monasticism in Sardinia and he supported the Gregorian reform and the archdiocese of Pisa.

According to legend, Constantine was the father of Francesca Chica, who married Henry of Cinarca, one of the most powerful men on Corsica.

| Preceded by Manfred | Giudice of Gallura c. 1065 – c. 1100 | Succeeded by Torgodorio I |
