= Torchitorio of Gallura =

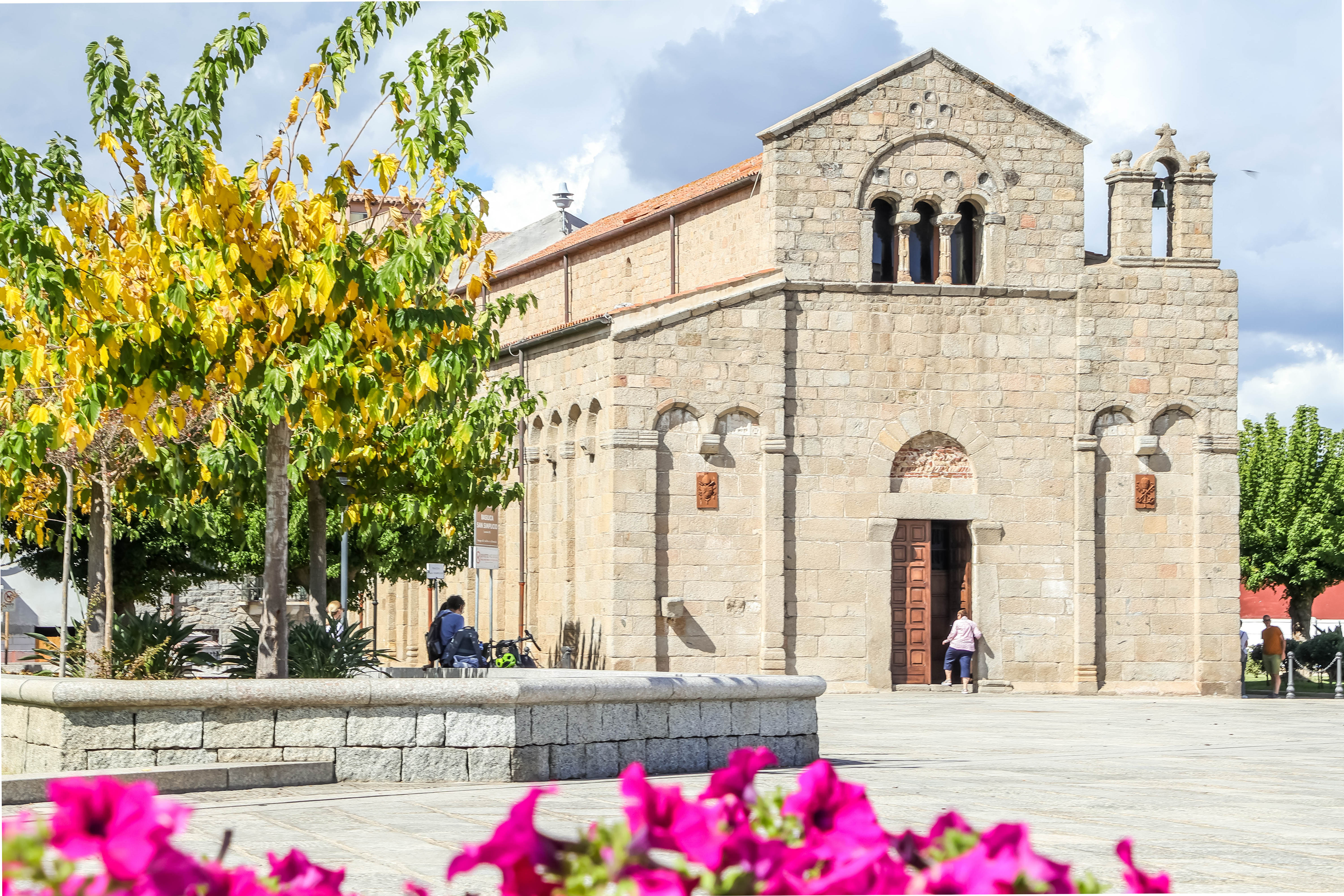
Church of Saint Simplicius at Olbia, constructed by Torchitorio.

Torchitorio de Zori (also spelled Torcotor(e)(io) or (T)(D)orgodorio, and also de Thori; died before 1113) is the earliest Judge of Gallura known with certainty and attested by contemporary sources. He lived in the late 11th century at a time when Sardinia was entering the wider Western European scene for the first time in centuries. Like his contemporary judges, he patronised Western monasticism.

== Works ==
His most enduring work was the building of a new church in Civita (modern Olbia), where he made his capital, in honour of Saint Simplicius, a sixth-century bishop and martyr of the city. Torchitorio also invited monks from Saint-Victor at Marseille to come to Gallura in 1089, in imitation of his contemporary Torchitorio I of Cagliari. He granted the new monks four churches and they in turn opened up new lines of intellectual and economic interchange with Provence.

Sometime after 1092, however, Torchitorio fell out with the church. Dagobert, Archbishop of Pisa and papal legate to the island, convoked a provincial synod at Porto Torres and declared Torthictorio excommunicate. The purpose of the anathema may have been less the result of the judge's vices, but more of his political support for the Emperor Henry IV and the Antipope Guibert. Evidence for this is suggested by the anathema pronounced on the entire province. Torchitorio's retainers reportedly denied him the kiss of peace and the brotherly salute.

He was dead by 1113, when his widow, Paulesa (Padulesa) de Gunale, made a donation to S. Maria di Pisa. The evidence after his death is that Ittocorre de Gunale usurped the throne from his son Saltaro. The Gunale and Thori families were ancient enemies only kept at peace during the marriage of Torchitorio and Padulesa. He probably also left a daughter who married Constantine Spanu.

== Sources ==
  - Manno, Giuseppe (1835). Storia di Sardegna. P.M. Visaj.

Preceded by Saltaro	Judge of Gallura c. 1080 – c. 1100	Succeeded by Ittocorre
