= Comita of Gallura =

The Giudicati of Sardinia.

Comita Spanu was the Giudice/King of Gallura, in Sardinia, from 1133 to 1146. He was the son and successor of Constantine II.

Around 1130, Comita, like Gonario II of Torres and Constantine I of Arborea, did homage to the archdiocese of Pisa. On 26 June 1132, Comita was at the judicial palace of Logudoro at Ardara to do homage to Roger, Archbishop of Pisa. This last act helped establish the supremacy of Logudoro by its strong relationship to the Pisan see.

Comita had five children:

- Constantine, acting judge of Arborea (1199), married Susanna daughter of Barisone II of Arborea
- Maria (died c. 1173)
- Comita (died after 1185)
- Elena (died c. 1159)
- Furat

== Sources ==
- Caravale, Mario (ed). Dizionario Biografico degli Italiani: XXVII Collenuccio – Confortini. Rome, 1982.

Preceded by Constantine II	Giudice of Gallura; 1133–1146	Succeeded by Constantine III
