= Hospito =

Hospito (Hospiton in Latin, Ospitone in Sardinian) was a Sardinian chief of Barbagia (dux Barbaricinorum) who converted to Christianity in the late sixth century. Gregory the Great, in a letter dated to 594, commended Hospito for his Christianity at a time when most of the Sardinians from the interior (Barbaricini) were still pagans "living, all like irrational animals, ignorant of the truth of God and worshiping wood and stone."

Hospito confirmed a peace with the Byzantine dux Zabardas and allowed the missionaries Felix and Ciriacus into Barbagia.
