= Manfred of Gallura =

Manfred was the legendary first Judge of Gallura. He was probably a client of the Republic of Pisa. His predecessor may have been Saltaro. He was succeeded by Baldo.

== Sources ==
- Manno, Giuseppe (1835). Storia di Sardegna. P.M. Visaj.

Unknown	Judge of Gallura c. 1020 – c. 1040	Succeeded by Baldo
