= Dei of Wa =

King of Wakoku, 4th-century Japan

Dei of Wa (禰), also known as Sodei (祖禰; lit. 'great ancestor'). was a King of Wakoku, who was compared to Emperor Nintoku, founder of the Kawachi dynasty by the historian Hidehiro Okada. He was not among the Five kings of Wa but would be another King of Wa predating them.

He is sometimes identified with “Mye (彌),” the Wa leader mentioned in the Book of Liang,

Kuranishi Yūko identifies him as the father of Sai of Wa who she identifies with Emperor Ingyō. Okada identifies him with Emperor Nintoku, the grandfather of Emperor Yūryaku.

Some dispute the identification as an individual and take the phrase Sodei to refer to ancestors as a whole.

== Basis for the name ==
This is the genealogy proposed by Okada:

Dei of Wa（Emperor Nintoku）
San of Wa（Emperor Richū）
Chin of Wa（Emperor Hanzei）	Sai of Wa（Emperor Ingyō）
Ko of Wa（Emperor Ankō）	Bu of Wa（Emperor Yūryaku）

The name Dei is recorded in the Book of Song as the Japanese king Wangmu to the Song dynasty of the Northern and Southern dynasties of China in 487,

Okada (岡田) said of Sodei (祖禰)

Sodei (祖禰) is Emperor Nintoku, the grandfather of Emperor Yūryaku.。

Bu of Wa, wrote in a letter addressed to the Song dynasty in China in 487 that he had been engaged in warfare both at sea and abroad since the generation of Grandfather-Dei「祖禰」or his grandfather Dei of Wa. There must be another King of Wa before San, Chin, and Sai.

== See also ==
- Yamato Kingship
- Wakoku
- Five kings of Wa

== Sources ==
- 岡田英弘『倭国』中央公論社,1977
- 岡田英弘『日本史の誕生』筑摩書房, 2008
