= Sai of Wa =

One of the five kings of Wa

- King of Wa
- Predecessor: Chin of Wa
- Successor: Ko of Wa
- Issue: Ko of Wa, Bu of Wa
Posthumous name
- Emperor Ingyo?

Genealogy of the Five kings of Wa and Emperors
Book of Song	Book of Liang
San (421, 425); Sai (443, 451); Kō (462) Chin (438); Bu (478)	San; Kō (Chin); Sai; Bu
Genealogy of Emperors in Nihon Shoki
^{15} Ōjin (Homuta-wake)^{16} Nintoku (Oho-sazaki)^{17} Richū (Izaho-wake) | ^{18} Hanzei (Mitsuha-wake) | ^{19} Ingyō (Oasatsuma-wakugo); Prince; Ichinohe-Oshiha | Prince; Kinashi-Karu | ^{20} Ankō (Anaho) | ^{21} Yūryaku (Wakatakeru)

Sai of Wa (済) was a king of Wa in the middle of the 5th century (Kofun era). He was also known as Wa Osai.

Father of Ko and Wu, he was one of the Wa. He is considered to be the 19th Emperor Ingyo.

== Records ==
=== Book of Liang ===
The Biography of Liang
In the Book of Liang, the article on "Yamato" (梁書倭伝) states that his son Je stood up after the death of "Ya", and his son Xing stood up after his death.。

=== History of the Southern Dynasties ===
In the History of the Southern Dynasties, the article on the Japanese Kingdom (Nan shi wagu den) describes the contents of the Song Shu Chronicles.

Table of Changes in the General Names of Koguryo Kings, Baekje Kings, and Japanese Kings
Year	Goguryeo	Baekje	Wa
317	Eastern Jin		
372		Geunchogo of Baekje	
386		Jinsa of Baekje	
413	Jangsu of Goguryeo		
416	Jangsu of Goguryeo	Jeonji of Baekje	
420	Liu Song dynasty		
420		Jeonji of Baekje	
421			San of Wa
438			Chin of Wa
443			Sai of Wa
451			Sai of Wa
457		Gaero of Baekje	
462			Ko of Wa
463	Jangsu of Goguryeo		
478			Bu of Wa
479	Southern Qi		
479			Bu of Wa
480	Jangsu of Goguryeo	Moudu	
490		Dongseong of Baekje	
494	Munjamyeong of Goguryeo		
502	Liang dynasty		
502	Munjamyeong of Goguryeo	Dongseong of Baekje	Bu of Wa

== Historical investigation ==
=== On the continuity between Je and Chin ===
In the article in the Sung Shu, Je takes the surname "Wa" (倭) as did the previous Japanese king Jin, but does not clarify his relationship to Jin. Since they do not name the continuation, there is a theory that Je and Chin were not close blood relatives, and since the Nihon Shoki shows a struggle in the succession to the throne after Emperor Nintoku, the possibility of the existence of such a struggle over the throne is pointed out In addition, since the Wazui can be seen as a particularly powerful royal family in the Chin period, there is a theory that there were two royal forces at that time (Mozu Kofun Cluster and Furuichi Kofun Cluster), and that Je may have been a lineage of this Wazui 。

=== Comparison of the tombs ===
During the period of activity of the Five kings of Wa, the tombs of the great kings were constructed in the Mozu Tombs and Furuichi Kofun Cluster (Osaka Prefecture, Sakai City, Habikino City, Fujiidera), and Je's tomb is assumed to be one of them. These tombs are now designated as mausoleums by the Miyouchi Agency, so there is a lack of archaeological data to date them, but one theory compares them to the Ichinoyama Kofun (the current imperial tomb of Emperor Ingyo).

Another archaeological source is the "Gift of Wang" excavated from the Inaridai Kofun Group (Ichihara City, Chiba Prefecture). (or Chin), since he is self-explanatory only by writing "Wang". It should be noted, however, that the iron sword from Inariyama burial mound inscription and the iron sword from Etafuneyama burial mound inscription are distinct from the "Great King" of the Inariyama Sword。

== Bibliography ==
=== Encyclopedias ===
- "King Sai of Wa (倭王済)". Japanese Name Dictionary (日本人名大辞典) (in Japanese). Kodansha (講談社). 2001.
- 坂元義種. "倭の五王". 国史大辞典. 吉川弘文館.
- 日本大百科全書（ニッポニカ）. 小学館.
  - 坂元義種 「倭の五王」、「済」。
- 坂元義種 (2006). "倭の五王". 日本古代史大辞典. 大和書房. ISBN 978-4479840657.
- 関和彦. "倭王済". 朝日日本歴史人物事典. 朝日新聞出版. - リンクは朝日新聞社「コトバンク」。

=== Other references ===
- Mori Kōshō (森公章) (2010). 倭の五王 5世紀の東アジアと倭王群像 [The Five Kings of Wa: East Asia in the 5th Century and the Portrait of the Wa Kings]. 日本史リブレット 人 002 (in Japanese). Yamakawa. ISBN 978-4634548022.
- Haruto Kawachi (河内春人) (2018). 倭の五王 -王位継承と五世紀の東アジア [The Five Kings of Wa - Succession to the Throne and East Asia in the 5th Century] (in Japanese). Chuokoron-Shinsha (中央公論新社). ISBN 978-4121024701.
- 石井正敏 (June 2005). "5世紀の日韓関係 - 倭の五王と高句麗・百済 -" (PDF). 日韓歴史共同研究報告書（第1期）. 日韓歴史共同研究. Archived from the original (PDF) on 2015-10-18.

== See also ==
- Five kings of Wa
- Emperor Ingyō
