= Chin of Wa =

5th-century king of Wa

- King of Wa
- Predecessor: San of Wa
- Successor: Sai of Wa
- Issue: Sai of Wa
Posthumous name
- Emperor Hanzei?

Genealogy of the Five kings of Wa and Emperors
Book of Song	Book of Liang
San (421, 425); Sai (443, 451); Kō (462) Chin (438); Bu (478)	San; Kō (Chin); Sai; Bu
Genealogy of Emperors in Nihon Shoki
^{15} Ōjin (Homuta-wake)^{16} Nintoku (Oho-sazaki)^{17} Richū (Izaho-wake) | ^{18} Hanzei (Mitsuha-wake) | ^{19} Ingyō (Oasatsuma-wakugo); Prince; Ichinohe-Oshiha | Prince; Kinashi-Karu | ^{20} Ankō (Anaho) | ^{21} Yūryaku (Wakatakeru)

Chin of Wa (倭珍) was a king of Wa in the early 5th century (middle Kofun era). He was also known as Wa Ochin (倭王珍).

San's younger brother and one of the Five kings of Wa. Some compare him to the 18th Emperor Hanzei.

== Records ==
=== Book of Liang ===
Book of Liang
In the Book of Liang, the article on Japan states that after the death of the Japanese king "Zan", his younger brother "Ya" stood up, and after his death, his son "Je" stood up.。

=== History of the Southern Dynasties ===
In the Nan shi, the article on the Japanese Kingdom (Nan shi wagu den) describes the contents of the Song Shu Chronicles.

Table of Changes in the General Names of Koguryo Kings, Baekje Kings, and Japanese Kings
Year	Goguryeo	Baekje	Wa
317	Eastern Jin		
372		Geunchogo of Baekje	
386		Jinsa of Baekje	
413	Jangsu of Goguryeo		
416	Jangsu of Goguryeo	Jeonji of Baekje	
420	Liu Song dynasty		
420		Jeonji of Baekje	
421			San of Wa
438			Chin of Wa
443			Sai of Wa
451			Sai of Wa
457		Gaero of Baekje	
462			Ko of Wa
463	Jangsu of Goguryeo		
478			Bu of Wa
479	Southern Qi		
479			Bu of Wa
480	Jangsu of Goguryeo	Moudu	
490		Dongseong of Baekje	
494	Munjamyeong of Goguryeo		
502	Liang dynasty		
502	Munjamyeong of Goguryeo	Dongseong of Baekje	Bu of Wa

== 参考文献 ==
- 事典類
  - "倭王珍". 日本人名大辞典 (in Japanese). 講談社.
  - 坂元義種. "倭の五王". 国史大辞典 (in Japanese). 吉川弘文館.
  - 日本大百科全書（ニッポニカ） (in Japanese). 小学館.
    - 坂元義種 「倭の五王」、「珍」。
  - 坂元義種 (2006). "倭の五王". 日本古代史大辞典 (in Japanese). 大和書房. ISBN 978-4479840657.
  - "珍". 日本古代氏族人名辞典 普及版 (in Japanese). 吉川弘文館. 2010. ISBN 978-4642014588.
  - 関和彦. "倭王珍". 朝日日本歴史人物事典 (in Japanese). 朝日新聞出版. - リンクは朝日新聞社「コトバンク」。
- その他文献
  - 森公章 (2010). 倭の五王 5世紀の東アジアと倭王群像（日本史リブレット 人 002） (in Japanese). 山川出版社. ISBN 978-4634548022.
  - 河内春人 (2018). 倭の五王 -王位継承と五世紀の東アジア-（中公新書2470） (in Japanese). 中央公論新社. ISBN 978-4121024701.

== See also ==
- Five kings of Wa
- Dei of Wa
- Emperor Hanzei
