= San of Wa =

One of the five kings of Wa

- King of Wa
- Predecessor: Emperor Nintoku?
- Successor: Chin of Wa
Posthumous name
- Emperor Richu?

Genealogy of the Five kings of Wa and Emperors
Book of Song	Book of Liang
San (421, 425); Sai (443, 451); Kō (462) Chin (438); Bu (478)	San; Kō (Chin); Sai; Bu
Genealogy of Emperors in Nihon Shoki
^{15} Ōjin (Homuta-wake)^{16} Nintoku (Oho-sazaki)^{17} Richū (Izaho-wake) | ^{18} Hanzei (Mitsuha-wake) | ^{19} Ingyō (Oasatsuma-wakugo); Prince; Ichinohe-Oshiha | Prince; Kinashi-Karu | ^{20} Ankō (Anaho) | ^{21} Yūryaku (Wakatakeru)

San of Wa (讃) was a king of Wa in the first half of the 5th century (middle of the Kofun era).

He was the brother of Chin, the first of the "Five kings of Wa" (although San is not seen as a king in the historical record). Some have compared him to either the 15th Emperor Ojin, the 16th Emperor Nintoku, or the 17th Emperor Richu.

== Records ==
=== Book of Song ===
Song Book, Chronicles

In the Book of Song, the Emperor Wu of Song issued an imperial decree in the 2nd year of Yongchou (421), ordering the Liu Song dynasty to grant Wu of Song a title for his tribute from Wanli.

In the 2nd year of Yuanjia (425), San also sent Cao Da, a librarian, to the Song dynasty to present a written appeal to Wen, and presented him with local specialties. Later, after San's death, his younger brother Jin stood as king.
The Book of Song (Song shu), Book of the Chronicles (Song shu), Book of the Chronicles (Song shu)
The Wen Di Ji, Yuan Jia 7 (430 years), Sho Tsuki article states that the king of Japan sent an envoy to present a fang material (a san or jin envoy?).

=== Book of Liang ===
In the Book of Liang, the article on Japan states that there was a "tribute" to the king of Japan when Emperor An of Jin of the Jin (Eastern Jin), and that when An died, his younger brother Ya stood up.

=== History of the Southern Dynasties ===
In the article of History of the Southern Dynasties, the Japanese envoys and tributes during the reign of Emperor An of the Jin dynasty and the contents of the Song Book of Biography are described.

=== Others ===
According to the article in the Book of Jin, in the 9th year of the reign of Emperor An (413), Goguryeo and Japan sent an envoy to offer a variety of goods (one theory is that it was an envoy from the Emperor Hsin). In the "Taiping Yulan" an anecdote in the "Ukihee Kiyoi Note" states that the tribute included "a ginseng and other items offered by the Japanese government.

Table of Changes in the General Names of Koguryo Kings, Baekje Kings, and Japanese Kings
Year	Goguryeo	Baekje	Wa
317	Eastern Jin		
372		Geunchogo of Baekje	
386		Jinsa of Baekje	
413	Jangsu of Goguryeo		
416	Jangsu of Goguryeo	Jeonji of Baekje	
420	Liu Song dynasty		
420		Jeonji of Baekje	
421			San of Wa
438			Chin of Wa
443			Sai of Wa
451			Sai of Wa
457		Gaero of Baekje	
462			Ko of Wa
463	Jangsu of Goguryeo		
478			Bu of Wa
479	Southern Qi		
479			Bu of Wa
480	Jangsu of Goguryeo	Moudu	
490		Dongseong of Baekje	
494	Munjamyeong of Goguryeo		
502	Liang dynasty		
502	Munjamyeong of Goguryeo	Dongseong of Baekje	Bu of Wa

== See also ==
- Five kings of Wa

== Bibliography ==
- 事典類
  - "倭王讃". 日本人名大辞典 (in Japanese). 講談社.
  - 坂元義種. "倭の五王". 国史大辞典 (in Japanese). 吉川弘文館.
  - 日本大百科全書（ニッポニカ） (in Japanese). 小学館.
    - 坂元義種 「倭の五王」、「讃」
  - 坂元義種 (2006). "倭の五王". 日本古代史大辞典 (in Japanese). 大和書房. ISBN 978-4479840657.
  - "讃". 日本古代氏族人名辞典 普及版 (in Japanese). 吉川弘文館. 2010. ISBN 978-4642014588.
  - 関和彦. "倭王讃". 朝日日本歴史人物事典 (in Japanese). 朝日新聞出版. - リンクは朝日新聞社「コトバンク」
- その他文献
  - 森公章 (2010). 倭の五王 5世紀の東アジアと倭王群像（日本史リブレット 人 002） (in Japanese). 山川出版社. ISBN 978-4634548022.
  - 河内春人 (2018). 倭の五王 -王位継承と五世紀の東アジア-（中公新書2470） (in Japanese). 中央公論新社. ISBN 978-4121024701.
