= Kō of Wa =

Japanese historical figure

- King of Wa
- Predecessor: Sai of Wa
- Successor: Bu of Wa
Posthumous name
- Emperor Ankō?

Genealogy of the Five kings of Wa and Emperors
Book of Song	Book of Liang
San (421, 425); Sai (443, 451); Kō (462) Chin (438); Bu (478)	San; Kō (Chin); Sai; Bu
Genealogy of Emperors in Nihon Shoki
^{15} Ōjin (Homuta-wake)^{16} Nintoku (Oho-sazaki)^{17} Richū (Izaho-wake) | ^{18} Hanzei (Mitsuha-wake) | ^{19} Ingyō (Oasatsuma-wakugo); Prince; Ichinohe-Oshiha | Prince; Kinashi-Karu | ^{20} Ankō (Anaho) | ^{21} Yūryaku (Wakatakeru)

Ko of Wa (興) was a historical figure in Japan during the 5th century. According to the Chinese historical book "Wajinden," he was one of the five kings of Wa (an ancient name for Japan) and became the crown prince after the death of his father, King Sai. He was sent as a tributary to the Southern Dynasty of China in 462, during the reign of Emperor Taiwu of the Northern Wei, and was appointed as the General of the East and given the title of king of Wa. Some theories suggest that he is comparable to the Emperor Ankō in the "Nihon Shoki" (Chronicles of Japan).

Son of Sai and brother of Bu, one of the Kings of Wa. Some have compared him to the 20th Emperor Ankō, others to Prince Ichibe Oshiwa, or Kinashi no Karu.

== Sources ==
Table of Changes in the General Names of Koguryo Kings, Baekje Kings, and Japanese Kings
Year	Goguryeo	Baekje	Wa
317	Eastern Jin		
372		Geunchogo of Baekje	
386		Jinsa of Baekje	
413	Jangsu of Goguryeo		
416	Jangsu of Goguryeo	Jeonji of Baekje	
420	Liu Song dynasty		
420		Jeonji of Baekje	
421			San of Wa
438			Chin of Wa
443			Sai of Wa
451			Sai of Wa
457		Gaero of Baekje	
462			Ko of Wa
463	Jangsu of Goguryeo		
478			Bu of Wa
479	Southern Qi		
479			Bu of Wa
480	Jangsu of Goguryeo	Moudu	
490		Dongseong of Baekje	
494	Munjamyeong of Goguryeo		
502	Liang dynasty		
502	Munjamyeong of Goguryeo	Dongseong of Baekje	Bu of Wa

== See also ==
- Five kings of Wa
- Emperor Ankō
