= Bu of Wa =

One of the five kings of Wa

- King of Wa
- Predecessor: Ko of Wa
- Successor: Emperor Seinei?
- Issue: Emperor Yuryaku?
Posthumous name
- Emperor Yuryaku?

Genealogy of the Five kings of Wa and Emperors
Book of Song	Book of Liang
San (421, 425); Sai (443, 451); Kō (462) Chin (438); Bu (478)	San; Kō (Chin); Sai; Bu
Genealogy of Emperors in Nihon Shoki
^{15} Ōjin (Homuta-wake)^{16} Nintoku (Oho-sazaki)^{17} Richū (Izaho-wake) | ^{18} Hanzei (Mitsuha-wake) | ^{19} Ingyō (Oasatsuma-wakugo); Prince; Ichinohe-Oshiha | Prince; Kinashi-Karu | ^{20} Ankō (Anaho) | ^{21} Yūryaku (Wakatakeru)

Bu of Wa (武) was a Japanese king in the late 5th century (middle Kofun era).

Son of Sai of Wa and brother of Ko of Wa, he was the last of the "Five kings of Wa". He is considered to be the 21st Emperor Yūryaku.

== Records ==
Table of Changes in the General Names of Koguryo Kings, Baekje Kings, and Japanese Kings
Year	Goguryeo	Baekje	Wa
317	Eastern Jin		
372		Geunchogo of Baekje	
386		Jinsa of Baekje	
413	Jangsu of Goguryeo		
416	Jangsu of Goguryeo	Jeonji of Baekje	
420	Liu Song dynasty		
420		Jeonji of Baekje	
421			San of Wa
438			Chin of Wa
443			Sai of Wa
451			Sai of Wa
457		Gaero of Baekje	
462			Ko of Wa
463	Jangsu of Goguryeo		
478			Bu of Wa
479	Southern Qi		
479			Bu of Wa
480	Jangsu of Goguryeo	Moudu	
490		Dongseong of Baekje	
494	Munjamyeong of Goguryeo		
502	Liang dynasty		
502	Munjamyeong of Goguryeo	Dongseong of Baekje	Bu of Wa

== See also ==
- Five kings of Wa
- Emperor Yūryaku
- Inariyama Sword
