= Five kings of Wa =

5th century Japanese envoys to China

The five kings of Wa (倭の五王, Wa no go ō) were kings of ancient Japan (Wa) who sent envoys to China during the 5th century to strengthen the legitimacy of their claims to power by gaining the recognition of the Chinese emperor. Details about them are unknown. According to written records in China, their names were San (讃), Chin (珍), Sai (濟), Kō (興) and Bu (武).

== Titles bestowed on the Kings of Wa ==
In general, five kings of Wa were bestowed the titles 安東[大]将軍倭国王 (Antō [Dai-]Shōgun, Wa-kokuō, [Grand] General of Antō, King of Wa). In the Southern Dynasties of China in this period, there were three ranks of General titles which were bestowed to the chiefs of the subject state (located in the East of China) who sent envoy to the emperor of the Dynasty. The highest general title was 征東大将軍 (Seitō Dai-Shōgun, Grand General conquering the East). The next high title was 鎮東大将軍 (Chintō Dai-Shōgun, Grand General appeasing the East). The third high title and the lowest among three was 安東大将軍 (Antō Dai-Shōgun, Grand General pacifying the East).

2rd rank General			3rd rank General		
Rank (品)	Military title	Endowed on	Rank (品)	Military title	Endowed on
2	征東大将軍; Grand General of Seitō	King of Goguryeo	3	征東将軍; General of Seitō	-
2	鎮東大将軍; Grand General of Chintō	King of Baekje	3	鎮東将軍; General of Chintō	-
2	安東大将軍; Grand General of Antō	Sai (King of Wa); Bu (King of Wa)	3	安東将軍; General of Antō	San, Chin, Sai, Kō (King of Wa)
			3	平西将軍; General of Heisei	Subject of Chin
			3	-	-
			3	征虜将軍; General of Seiryo	Subject of Chin

In the Song dynasty, the emperor bestowed 征東大将軍 (Grand General conquering the East) on the King of Goguryeo, and 鎮東大将軍 (Grand General appeasing the East) on the King of Baekje. However, the Song Emperor bestowed the third general title, 安東大将軍 (Grand General pacifying the East) on the King of Wa. There are interpretations on this fact that the King of Goguryeo stood in the highest rank, and the King of Wa stood in the lowest rank, while the King of Baekje stood between Goguryeo and Wa. But there are also other opinions against this interpretation. (Note: The facts recorded in the Chinese history books show that the Kings of Wa did not ask the higher title of the Generals of the East of China, such as General Chintō (鎮東将軍) or General Seitō (征東将軍). The five Kings of Wa always asked or styled "[Grand] General Antō (安東[大]将軍)". If there was substantial difference in status among the Three General titles, King Chin and King Bu could ask the title of "General Chintō" or "General Seitō". But they did not. In addition, if the Kings of Wa stood in lower status due to their General title than the Kings of Baekje, it is strange that King Chin and King Bu asked the title of Military Governor which has the power of ruling the land of Baekje whose King had the higher General title.) The difference of general ranks among the three states (Goguryo, Baekje, and Wa) was due to the order which each state had first sent envoy to the dynasty, and it cannot be said that the ranks of Goguryeo and Baekje were substantially higher than that of Wa. Sakamoto also points out the different view on these general titles.

== Chinese records and the bestowed titles on the kings of Wa ==
Gregorian date (AD)	Dynasty	Chinese calendar	Original Chinese source	King of Wa	Short summary (Note: These titles for sovereignty over the states described had no bearing on reality. The appointments reflected the struggle for hegemony over the Korean Peninsula between Goguryeo and Wa, as depicted in the Gwanggaeto Stele.)
413	Jin	Giki 9 (義熙九年)	Book of Jin, Taiping Yulan	Unknown (Note: This is listed under "King San" in the Book of Liang)	The king of Wa sent a tributary.
421	Song	Eisho 2 (永初二年)	Book of Song	San	King San sent a tributary to Jin. Emperor Wu of Song bestowed the title, possibly 安東将軍倭国王 (General pacifying the East, King of Wa), on San.
425	Song	Genka 2 (元嘉二年)	Book of Song	San	King San sent Shiba Sōtatsu (司馬曹達) (Note: In this case, Shiba might be the title of Sōtatsu, rather than his surname. Sōtatsu might be a member of toraijin group.) as an envoy and made Emperor Wen of Song a present.
430	Song	Genka 7 (元嘉七年)	Book of Song	Unknown (Note: Possibly King San)	In January, the king of Wa sent a tribute.
438	Song	Genka 15 (元嘉十五年)	Book of Song	Chin	King San died, his younger brother Chin succeeded to the throne. Chin sent a tribute and styled himself the title of 使持節都督倭百済新羅任那秦韓慕韓六国諸軍事安東大将軍倭国王. In April, Emperor Wen appointed Chin to the title of 安東将軍倭国王 (General pacifying the East, King of Wa). The emperor also appointed Wa Zui (倭隋) and other 13 subordinates of Chin to the titles of 平西征虜冠軍輔国将軍 (Note: These titles (平西・征虜・冠軍・輔国-将軍) contain 4 General titles (not one title). 1) 平西将軍 (General Heisei), 2) 征虜将軍 (General Seiryo), 3) 冠軍将軍 (General Kangun), 4) 輔国将軍 (General Hokoku).).
443	Song	Genka 20 (元嘉二十年)	Book of Song	Sai	Sai sent a tribute and was appointed to the title of 安東将軍倭国王 (General pacifying the East, King of Wa).
451	Song	Genka 28 (元嘉二十八年)	Book of Song	Sai	King Sai was appointed to the title of 使持節都督倭新羅任那加羅秦韓慕韓六国諸軍事. as well as 安東将軍 (General pacifying the East). In July, Sai was promoted to the title of 安東大将軍倭国王 (Grand General pacifying the East, King of Wa). 23 subordinates were also promoted.
460	Song	Daimei 4 (大明四年)		Unknown (Note: Possibly King Sai)	In December, the king of Wa sent a tribute.
462	Song	Daimei 6 (大明六年)	Book of Song	Kō	In March, Emperor Xiaowu of Song appointed Kō, a crown prince of Sai, to the title of 安東将軍倭国王. (General pacifying the East, King of Wa)
477	Song	Shōmei 1 (昇明元年)	Book of Song	Bu	In November, the king of Wa sent a tribute. King Kō died, his younger brother Bu succeeded to the throne. Bu styled himself the title of 使持節都督倭百済新羅任那加羅秦韓慕韓七国諸軍事安東大将軍倭国王.
478	Song	Shōmei 2 (昇明二年)	Book of Song	Bu	Bu styled himself the title of 開府儀同三司 and petitioned the official appointment. Emperor Shun of Song appointed Bu to the title of 使持節都督倭新羅任那加羅秦韓慕韓六国諸軍事安東大将軍倭王.
479	Qi	Kengen 1 (建元元年)	Book of Qi	Bu	Emperor Gao of Qi promoted Bu to the title of 鎮東大将軍 (征東将軍) (Grand General appeasing the East, (General conquering the East)). (Note: The promotions in 479 and 502 were automatic given the establishment of new dynasties in China.)
502	Liang	Tenkan 1 (天監元年)	Book of Liang	Bu	In April, Emperor Wu of Liang promoted Bu to the title of 征東大将軍 (Grand General conquering the East).

== Comparison with the Nihon Shoki ==
Genealogy of the Five kings of Wa and Emperors
Book of Song	Book of Liang
San (421, 425); Sai (443, 451); Kō (462) Chin (438); Bu (478)	San; Kō (Chin); Sai; Bu
Genealogy of Emperors in Nihon Shoki
^{15} Ōjin (Homuta-wake)^{16} Nintoku (Oho-sazaki)^{17} Richū (Izaho-wake) | ^{18} Hanzei (Mitsuha-wake) | ^{19} Ingyō (Oasatsuma-wakugo); Prince; Ichinohe-Oshiha | Prince; Kinashi-Karu | ^{20} Ankō (Anaho) | ^{21} Yūryaku (Wakatakeru)

=== Lack of records - two interpretations ===
In the Nihon Shoki, there are no records about "five Kings of Wa" or any kings with the names San, Chin, Sai, Kō or Bu. There are no records that any Daiō (great kings) of the Yamato Kingship sent envoys to Chinese emperors at all. On the other hand, the five Kings of Wa were clearly recorded in Chinese official histories. In order to explain this situation, two kinds of interpretations have been proposed and discussed.

1. The five Kings of Wa and their diplomatic activities had really existed, but the formal history book, Nihon Shoki, intentionally omitted these facts. The reason might be a policy which the Yamato kingship had adopted since the late sixth century. That is, Japan (Wa, Yamato) would not be involved in the Chinese Sakuhō tributary system and would not be a subject state of China. Crown Prince Shōtoku advocated this policy. Even in this interpretation there were still other problems, including why the Kings of Wa had only named themselves with unusual single kanji letter names such as San or Chin.
2. The other interpretation is that the five Kings of Wa were not Yamato kings, but rather local chiefs such as the kings of the Kyūshū dynasty. They sent envoys under the self-declared title of King of Wa. This interpretation could explain the strange one letter names of the five Kings. Therefore, the Nihon Shoki had not intentionally omitted the historical facts recorded by Chinese sources.

The first interpretation is traditional and the major stream of historical study of ancient Japan. But in this view, the identification problems arise. Many disputes have taken place over which "King of Wa" corresponds to which Emperor in the Nihon Shoki.

=== Identification problems ===
As the name of kings recorded in Chinese history are very different from the names of Emperors in the Nihon Shoki, the specification of which emperor was the one recorded is the subject of numerous disputes which have endured for centuries. Most contemporary historians assign the five Japanese kings to the following emperors (two possibilities are identified for the Kings San and Chin), mostly based on the individual features of their genealogies reported in the Chinese sources.

On the other hand, archeological evidence, such as the inscriptions on the Inariyama and Eta Funayama Sword, also supports the idea that Bu is equivalent to Emperor Yūryaku, who was called Wakatakeru Ōkimi by his contemporaries.

- San 讃: Emperor Nintoku or Emperor Richū
- Chin 珍: Emperor Hanzei or Emperor Nintoku
- Sai 濟: Emperor Ingyō
- Kō 興: Emperor Ankō
- Bu 武: Emperor Yūryaku

Since Bu is most likely to be Yūryaku, Kō, who is said to be Bu's older brother, is likely to be an equivalent of Ankō, who is also noted in the Nihonshoki as an elder brother to Yūryaku. However, the Book of Song records Kō as "Crown Prince Kō"; there is a possibility that he is not Ankō, but rather Prince Kinashi no Karu, who was a crown prince of Ingyō.

== Meanings of titles bestowed on the kings of Wa ==
In the age of the Song Dynasty and the Southern Dynasties, there were various titles for high officials and military lords of the empire. These titles were also bestowed on the monarchs of the subject States in the Sakuhō System.

The King of Wa was usually granted the two titles, "(Grand) General Antō" (安東(大)将軍, Antō (Dai) Shōgun) and "King of Wa" (倭国王, Wa-Kokuō). Some Kings of Wa, such as King Chin or King Bu, asked for titles of higher ranks. The Emperor of Chinese Dynasty bestowed some of them, but did not approve every title requested.

King Chin asked for the titles "使持節都督倭百済新羅任那秦韓慕韓六国諸軍事安東大将軍倭国王" (Note: "使持節-都督-[倭-百済-新羅-任那-秦韓-慕韓-六国]-諸軍事-安東大将軍-倭国王", that is: 使持節(Shijisetsu)-都督(Totoku)-[倭(Wa)-百済(Baekje)-新羅(Silla)-任那(Mimana)-秦韓(Shinkan)-慕韓(Bokan)-六国(Rokkoku)]-諸軍事(Shogunji)-安東大将軍(Antō-Dai-Shōgun)-倭国王(Wa-Kokuō)) (Shijisetsu, Totoku, Wa, Baekje, Silla, Mimana, Shinkan, Bokan, Rokkoku-Shogunji, Antō-Dai-Shōgun, Wa-Kokuō). This contains the Five Titles.

1. 使持節, Shijisetsu : Highest Rank Military Commander (General) (Note: There were three ranks in Military high official (Generals). The highest rank was called 使持節 Shijisetsu, the next higher rank was 持節 Jisetsu, the lowest rank was 仮節 Kasetsu. 節 setsu is a small wand indicating that emperor gave the formal mission to one who holds it.)
2. 都督, Totoku : Military Governor
3. 都督-Region-諸軍事, Totoku - Region - Shogunji : Governor/Commander ruling all the military matters of the said Region (Region, State, Province, etc.)
4. 安東大将軍, Antō Dai-Shōgun : Grand General of Antō (Grand General pacifying the East)
5. 倭国王, Wa-Kokuō : King of Wa State

Therefore, ”使持節都督倭百済新羅任那秦韓慕韓六国諸軍事安東大将軍倭国王" means 1) Highest Rank Military General, 2) Governor ruling all the military matters of the Six States - Wa, Baekje, Silla, Mimana, Shinkan and Bokan, 3) Grand General pacifying the East, 4) King of Wa. The Song court did not approve the Title of 都督- 百済 -諸軍事 (Totoku - Baekje - Shogunji). The Song did not approve that King Chin would hold the power of militarily ruling the State area of Baekje. (King Bu also asked this power - militarily ruling the Baekje State - but the Song did not approve his request either.)

King Bu asked the Title 開府儀同三司 (Kaifu Gidō-Sanshi). This Title Kaifu Gidō-Sanshi is particularly high rank. The Emperor of Song did not approve, and instead bestowed the Titles "使持節都督倭新羅任那加羅秦韓慕韓六国諸軍事安東大将軍倭王" (Shijisetsu, Totoku, Wa, Silla, Mimana, Kara (Gaya), Shinkan, Bokan, Rokkoku-Shogunji, Antō Dai-Shōgun, Wa-Kokuō).

1. 開府儀同三司 Kaifu Gidō-Sanshi : Person whose Position is equivalent or corresponds to the "Three Lords" (Highest Ranking Officials in the old Imperial Chinese governments. That is, 丞相 (司徒) Jōshō (Shito), 太尉 Taii, 御史大夫 (司空) Gyoshi-Taifu (Shikū). (Note: 1) 丞相 (Chancellor), 2) 太尉 (Grand Commandant), 3) 御史大夫 (Grand Secretary).)

== See also ==
- Kofun Period
- Wakoku
