= Isuzu (disambiguation) =

Isuzu is a Japanese vehicle manufacturer.

Isuzu may also refer to:

- Isuzu River, a body of water in Japan
- Japanese cruiser Isuzu, a Nagara-class cruiser in the Imperial Japanese Navy launched in 1921
- Isuzu-class destroyer escort, a class of naval vessel in the Japan Maritime Self-Defense Force
- Isuzu Yamada (1917–2012), Japanese actress
- Isuzu Sento, a fictional character from the Amagi Brilliant Park light novel series
- Isuzu Sohma, a fictional character from the Fruit Baskets manga series
- Emi Isuzu, a character in the manga and anime series Tenjho Tenge
- Joe Isuzu, an American advertising character
