= Princess Iwa =

Japanese poet and empress-consort of the Kofun period

Iwa

Empress consort of Japan
- Tenure: 314–347 (traditional years)
- Spouse: Emperor Nintoku
- Issue: Emperor Richū; Prince Suminoe no Nakatsu; Emperor Hanzei; Prince Oasatsuma wakugo no Sukune
- House: Imperial House of Japan

Princess Iwa (磐之媛命, Iwa no hime no Mikoto; d. 347), sometimes known as Empress Iwa no hime (磐姫皇后, Iwa no hime kōgō), was a poet and the empress consort of Emperor Nintoku, who was the 16th emperor of Japan, according to the traditional order of succession. She was a descendant of Emperor Kōgen.

== Biography ==
No firm dates can be assigned to Emperor Nintoku's life or reign, nor to that of his first wife. Nintoku is considered to have ruled the country during the late-fourth century and early-fifth century, but there is a paucity of information about him. There is insufficient material available for further verification and study.

Princess Iwa's poetry, or poems attributed to her, are included in the Kojiki, the Nihon Shoki and the Man'yōshū. Her tomb is said to be located in Nara Prefecture.

== Literature ==
Poems which Iwa-no hime is said to have exchanged with her husband are related in the Kojiki and in the Nihon Shoki. Nintoku is reported to have suffered the resentment of the Iwa-no hime during a period in which he stopped the collection of taxes, which meant that even ordinary repairs to the palace were also deferred.

Poetry attributed to Iwa is collected in the Man'yōshū, the oldest existing collection of Japanese poetry believed to have been collected by Ōtomo no Yakamochi (大伴 家持). In her four songs she expressed love and longing for her husband. Some modern scholars, however, advise a healthy skepticism in these difficult to verify attributions.

== Burial mound tomb ==
The Imperial tomb of Iwa no hime no Mikoto is said to be located in Saki-chō in the city of Nara. Both kofun-type Imperial tombs are characterized by a keyhole-shaped island located within a wide, water-filled moat.

== Issue ==
- Prince Ooe no Izahowake (大兄去来穂別尊) Emperor Richū
- Prince Suminoe no Nakatsu (住吉仲皇子)
- Prince Mizuhawake (瑞歯別尊) Emperor Hanzei
- Prince Oasatsuma wakugo no Sukune (雄朝津間稚子宿禰尊) Emperor Ingyō

== Notes ==
Japanese royalty
Preceded by Nakatsuhime	Empress consort of Japan; 314–347	Succeeded by Princess Yata
