= Princess Wakatarashihime =

Legendary Japanese princess and Saiō of Ise Jingū

Wakatarashihime 稚足姫 皇女
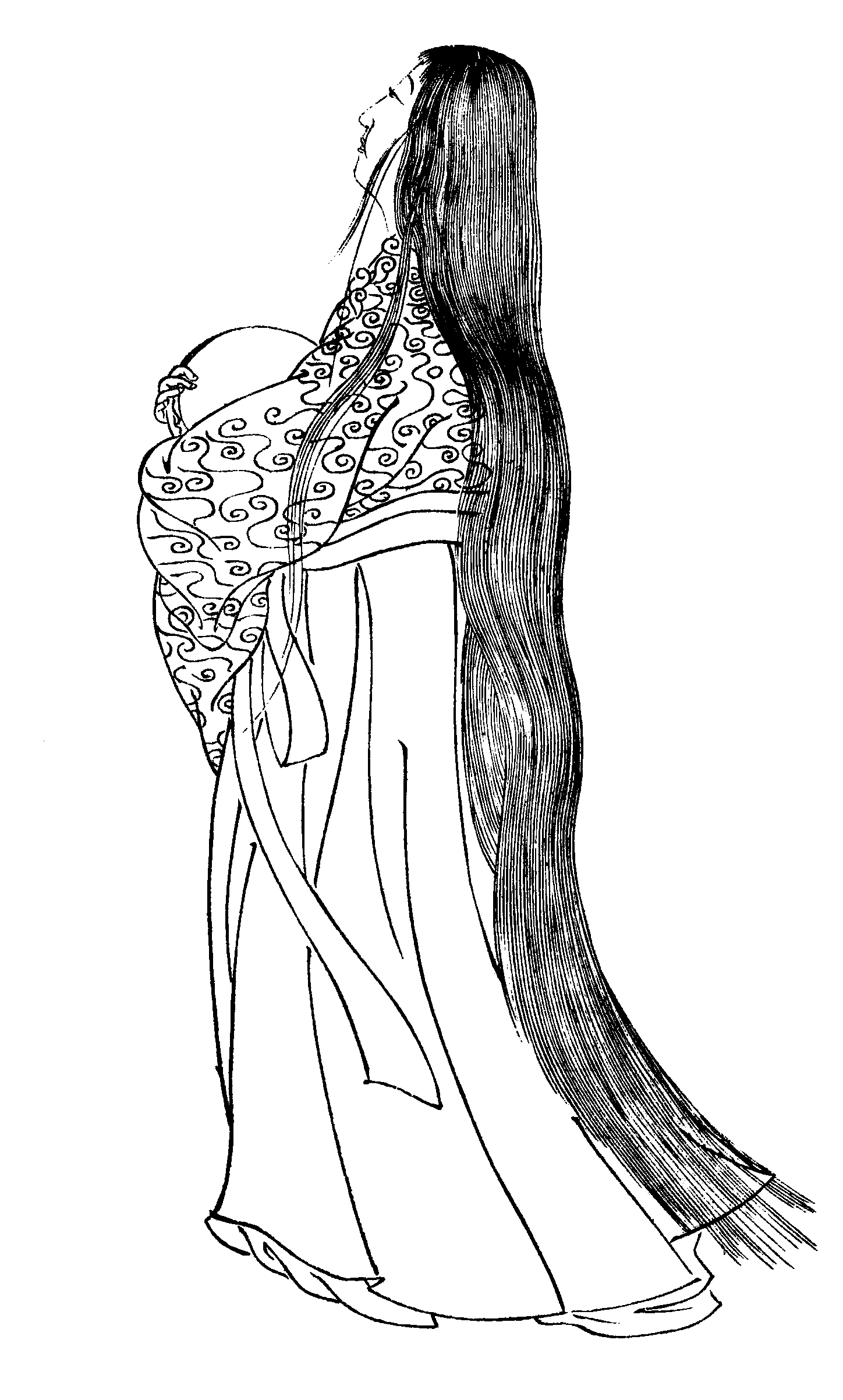
- A depiction of the Princess from the Zenken Kojitsu

Saiō
- Tenure: 456 – 459
- Predecessor: Princess Iwashi
- Successor: Princess Sasage
- Died: 459; Isuzu River
- House: Imperial house of Japan
- Father: Emperor Yūryaku
- Mother: Katsuragi no Karahime

Princess Wakatarashihime (稚足姫皇女; Wakatarashi-hime) was a Japanese princess and Saiō of Ise Jingū Grand Shrine. Her father was Emperor Yūryaku and her mother was Katsuragi no Karahime.

== Life ==
Born to Emperor Yūryaku, and a consort named Katsuragi no Karahime, Wakatarashihime became Saiō in 456. (Note: She is said to have committed suicide three years after becoming Saiō. She is estimated to have died in 459, hence the estimation that she became Saiō in 456.) However three years into her tenureship as Saiō, Ae no Kunimi accused a man named Takehiko, who was a son of Iokibe no Kikoyu, of having sex (possibly raping) with the princess and impregnating her. The saiō was supposed to remain a virgin and unmarried, and breaking this could cost a woman the title. For example, in 578 Princess Uji, daughter of Emperor Bidatsu, lost the title less than a year into her job after being raped, thus no longer being a virgin. The princess pleaded her innocence, stating:

Thy handmaiden knows nothing.

and took out a sacred mirror, and recited a poem. (Note: The Shaku Nihongi specifies the Yata no Kagami. William Aston makes no reference to the poem in his translation of the Nihon Shoki.)

== Death ==
Following her poem, the Princess soon went missing, and the Emperor had people search for her. The princess had left for Isuzu River, and committed suicide by hanging herself. The princess's mirror was found buried near Isuzu River, and soon after the princess's body was found. Her body was soon cut open, where it was found that she had not in fact been pregnant, thus proving her and Takehiko's innocence; however by this point Takehiko was also dead after being murdered by his father.

Takehiko's father was relieved at his son's innocence, however was remorseful at murdering his son. So he murdered Kunimi and fled to Isonokami Shrine.
