= Kusaka no Hatabi no hime =

Empress consort of Japan
- Tenure: 457–479
- Died: after 457
- Spouse: Emperor Yūryaku
- House: Imperial House of Japan
- Father: Emperor Nintoku

Kusaka no Hatabi no hime (? – after 457) was Empress of Japan as the consort of Emperor Yūryaku.

She was the daughter of Emperor Nintoku.

== Notes ==
Japanese royalty
| Preceded by Princess Nakashi | Empress consort of Japan; 457–479 | Succeeded by Princess Naniwa no Ono |
