= Nakatsuhime =

Empress consort and dowager of Japan

Nakatsuhime 仲姫命
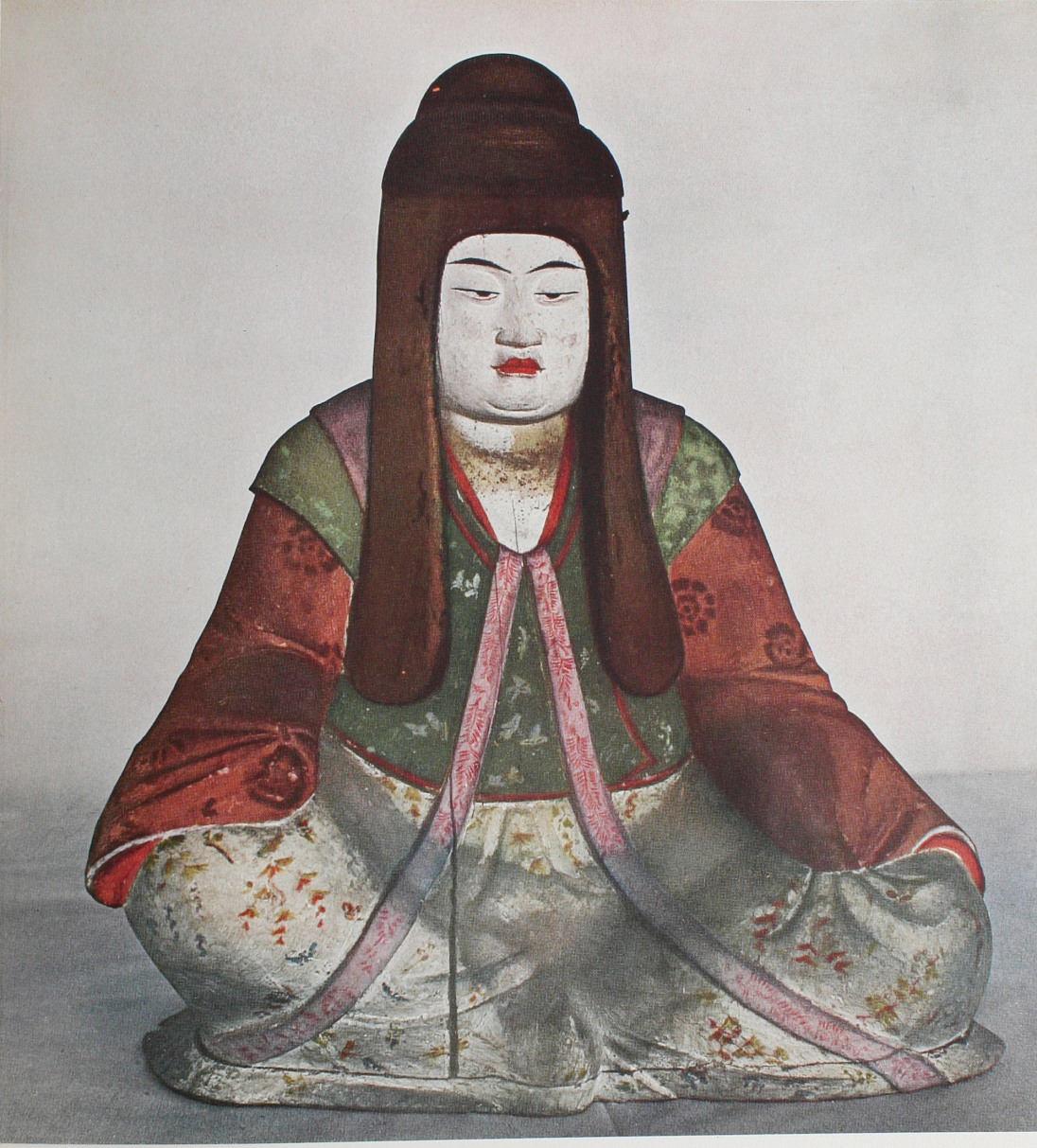

Empress consort of Japan
- Tenure: 270 – 311

Empress dowager of Japan
- Tenure: appointed in 311
- Burial: Nakatsuyama Kofun
- Spouse: Emperor Ōjin
- Issue: Princess Arata; Emperor Nintoku; Prince Netori
- House: Imperial House of Japan
- Father: Hondama-waka no Ō
- Mother: Kanataya-no-hime no Mikoto

Nakatsuhime (仲姫命; Nakatsuhime-no-Mikoto) was the empress consort of Japan from 270 to 311, and then the empress dowager of Japan from 311 until an unknown date of death. Her father was Prince Hondama-waka (品陀真若王; Hondama-waka no Ō) and her mother was Princess Kanataya (金田屋姫命; Kanataya-no-hime no Mikoto), and Nakatsuhime was herself a great-granddauguter of Emperor Keikō.

== Life ==
Nakatsuhime was born a great-granddauguter of Emperor Keikō. Prior to becoming the empress consort, Emperor Ōjin took her sister as a consort.

According to the Kojiki and the Nihon Shoki, the empress bore the emperor three children listed in the following order: Princess Arata, (Note: Listed in the Kojiki as The Lady of Arata in Ki.) Emperor Nintoku, and Prince Netori.

Furthermore the emperor then took another sister of the empress as his consort.

Following the death of Emperor Ōjin, she was appointed empress dowager, however, little else is written about her. The Imperial Household Agency has designated her tomb as Nakatsuyama Kofun, and it is the second largest tomb in that region after the Konda Gobyoyama Kofun, which is believed to be the tomb of her husband, Emperor Ōjin.

== Notes ==
Japanese royalty
Preceded by Okinagatarashi-hime	Empress consort of Japan; 270–311	Succeeded by Princess Iwa
Preceded by Okinagatarashi-hime	Empress dowager of Japan appointed in 311	Succeeded by Oshisaka no Ōnakatsuhime
