= Isuzu River =

Coordinates: 34°30′56″N 136°44′38″E

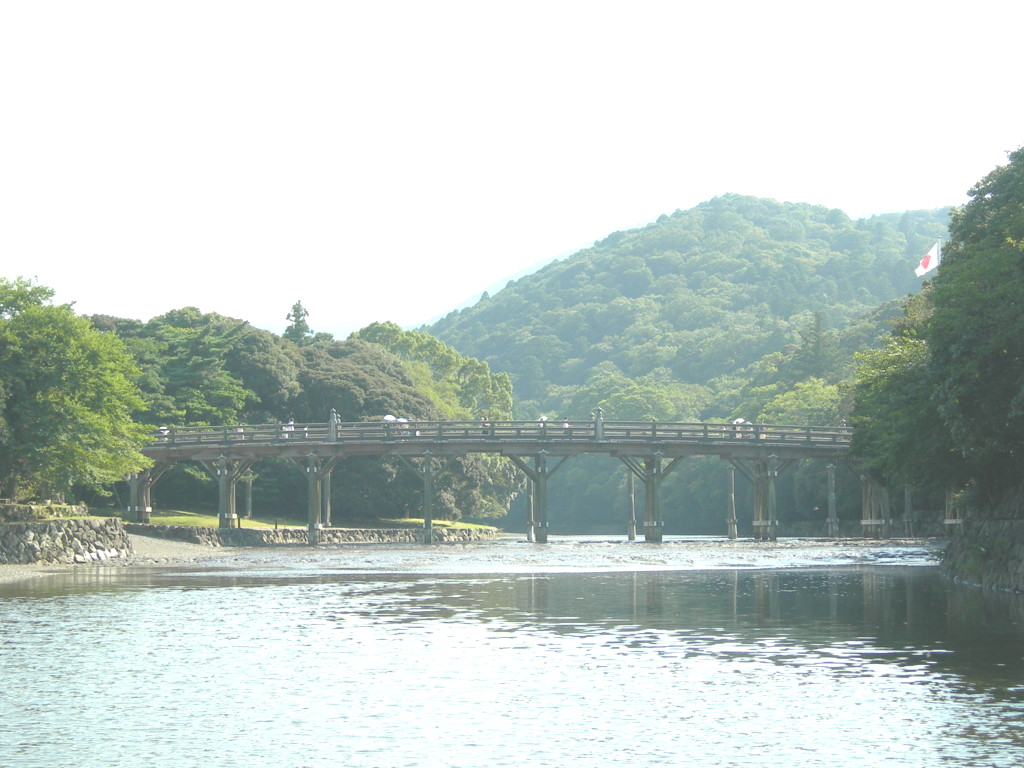
- People entering Ise Grand Shrine must cross the Isuzu River via the Uji Bridge

Location
- Country: Japan

Physical characteristics
- Source
  - location: Mount Kamiji
- Mouth
  - location: Ise Bay

The Isuzu River (五十鈴川, Isuzu-gawa) is a river that has both its source and its mouth in the city of Ise, Mie Prefecture, Japan. The river is notable because it flows through Ise Grand Shrine and, due to its strong association with the Shrine, many songs and poems have been written about it throughout history. The Uji Bridge serves as the entrance to Ise Grand Shrine, and crosses the Isuzu River. The vehicle manufacturer Isuzu is named after the river.

== Death of Princess Wakatarashihime ==
Isuzu River is a central part during the death of Princess Wakatarashihime. According to legend, following the accusation of being impregnated by a son of a court noble, the princess pleaded her innocence and recited a poem before going missing soon after.

The princess was later found dead, after committing suicide by the river.
