= Emperor Yūryaku =

Emperor of Japan from 456 to 479

Emperor Yūryaku 雄略天皇
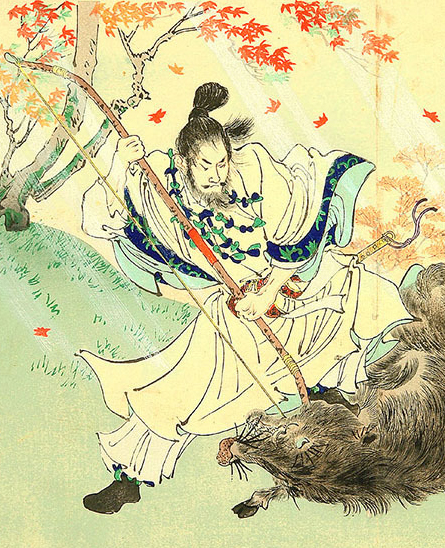
- Woodblock print of Yūryaku hunting Wild Boars by Adachi Ginkō, 1896

Emperor of Japan
- Reign: 456 – 479 (traditional)
- Predecessor: Ankō
- Successor: Seinei
- Born: 417–418 (Note: Yūryaku's birth year is mentioned as either 417 or 418 AD.)
- Died: 479 (aged 61–62) (Note: According to Delmer Brown, the Nihon Shoki states that Yūryaku lived to be 104. This age differs from the Kojiki which gives an "advanced age" of 124. Edmond Papinot gives an age of 62 for Yūryaku which matches the "417" birth year given by other sources.); Hatsuse no Asakura Palace
- Burial: Tajihi no Takawashi-no-hara no misasagi (丹比高鷲原陵) (Habikino, Osaka)
- Spouse: Kusaka-no-hatabihime
- Issue among others...: Emperor Seinei
Posthumous name
- Chinese-style shigō: Emperor Yūryaku (雄略天皇) Japanese-style shigō: Ōhatsuse Wakatakeru no Mikoto (大泊瀬幼武尊天皇)
- House: Imperial House of Japan
- Father: Emperor Ingyō
- Mother: Oshisaka no Ōnakatsuhime

Emperor Yūryaku (雄略天皇, Yūryaku-tennō) (417/18 – 479) was the 21st Emperor of Japan, according to the traditional order of succession. According to the Kojiki, this Emperor is said to have ruled from the Thirteenth Day of the Eleventh Month of 456 (Heishin) until his death on the Seventh Day of the Eighth Month of 479 (Kibi). He is the first archaeologically verifiable Japanese emperor.

== Protohistoric narrative ==
The Japanese have traditionally accepted this sovereign's historical existence, and a mausoleum (misasagi) for Yūryaku is currently maintained. The following information available is taken from the pseudo-historical Kojiki and Nihon Shoki, which are collectively known as Kiki (記紀) or Japanese chronicles. These chronicles include legends and myths, as well as potential historical facts that have since been exaggerated and/or distorted over time. It is recorded in the Kiki that Yūryaku was born to Oshisaka no Ōnakatsuhime (忍坂大中姫) sometime in 417 or 418 AD, and was given the name Ōhatsuse no Wakatakeru (Note: This name literally means "Wakatake (Young Warrior) of Great Hatsuse", where "Hatsuse" is the old name for Sakurai, Nara.) (大泊瀬稚武皇子). As the fifth and youngest son of Emperor Ingyō he was never given the title of "Crown Prince" due to his two older living brothers. (Note: Emperor Ankō never had direct-blood related children of his own.)

=== Ascension ===
Ōhatsuse was thrown into a fit of rage when he learned that his brother Emperor Ankō was assassinated in 456 AD. He then immediately became suspicious of his two elder brothers as conspirers. Ōhatsuse's first action was to question Prince Shirahiko regarding what could have happened. Shirahiko allegedly knew Ōhatsuse was up to no good, so he sat silently (Note: William George Aston notes that the Kojiki "relates these events quite differently". Both brothers are shown to be vocal in defending themselves.) which prompted Ōhatsuse to kill them both individually with a sword. He then turned his rage towards the boy assassin Mayowa no Ōkimi (Prince Mayowa), and his other brother Kurohiko by burning him to death. This just left Emperor Richū's eldest son Prince Ichinobe no Oshiwa in contention for the throne.

Ōhatsuse was resentful that Ankō had formally wished to transfer the kingdom to Ichinobe. Both the Nihon Shoki and Kojiki describe how Ōhatsuse took Prince Ichinobe and his younger brother Prince Mima out hunting and "treacherously" killed them. The sons of Prince Ichinobe fled to Harima and went into hiding, later becoming Emperor Kenzō and Emperor Ninken. Ōhatsuse (later known as Emperor Yūryaku) was then enthroned sometime afterwards in November 456. The new emperor subsequently made Asakura no Miya at Sakurai, Nara the location of his imperial palace. Emperor Richū's widow Kusaka no Hatabi no hime was appointed Empress with three concubines in March 457.

=== Reign ===
According to the Kiki, Emperor Yūryaku's reign was full of tyranny and cruelty. He allegedly ordered a girl to "have her four limbs stretched on a tree and be roasted to death" due to misplaced affection. Another account states that he killed one of his servants during a hunt because his servant did not understand how to cut up animal meat. Yūryaku also allegedly removed a high official to a distant post so he could help himself to the man's wife. The Emperor arbitrary and capriciously killed so many men and women that he was referred to as Emperor of Great Wickedness by the public. However, it is noted that Yūryaku improved his behavior after being admonished by the empress. On a more positive side, Yūryaku greatly encouraged agriculture during his reign and had his consort plant mulberry trees and cultivate silkworms. The Emperor was also known as a poet, and someone who enjoyed arts and crafts as expert handicraftsmen were commissioned from Baekje (Korea). While the Empress herself never bore Yūryaku any children, he had three sons and two daughters with his concubines.

In the 22nd year of his reign (477 AD) Yūryaku moved a shrine dedicated to Toyouke-hime from Tanba to Ise (modern day Ise, Mie). (Note: British academic and author Richard Ponsonby-Fane notes that "his majesty caused the temple of Toyoukeohokami to be moved from Tanba to Yamada in Ise." Originally the village around the Inner Shrine was named Uji, and the village around the Outer Shrine was named Yamada. These two villages were later merged during the Meiji era.) This newly founded shrine named Gekū (外宮) is now a part of the Ise Shrine complex. According to "Toyuke Shrine Book of Rituals (止由気宮儀式帳, Toyukegū gishikichō)" (written in 884 AD), the goddess Toyouke originally came from Tamba. It records that Emperor Yūryaku was told by Amaterasu in his dream that she alone was not able to supply enough food, so that Yūryaku needed to bring Toyuke-no-Ōkami (等由気大神), or the goddess of divine meals, from Hijino Manai in ancient Tanba Province.

Yūryaku appointed his son Prince Shiraka (白髪皇子) as heir apparent in 478 AD before dying in the following year. The Nihon Shoki mentions that Yūryaku lived to be 104, while the Kojiki gives his age as 124. His son Shiraka was later enthroned as Emperor Seinei in 480 AD.

=== Folklore ===
In Shinto folklore, events during Yūryaku's reign include meeting the Kami "Hitokotonushi" while hunting on Mount Katsuraki in 460 AD. The Kami appeared to him as a tall man whose face and demeanor resembled the Emperor's. After introductions Hitokotonushi joined Yūryaku as the two hunted deer until sunset. He then escorted the Emperor "as far as the waters of Kume." Another encounter with a Kami occurred in 463 AD through an invitation to the thunder god of Mimuro hill (御室山, Mimuro-yama) to the Imperial Palace. The Emperor sent his royal messenger Chiisakobe no muraji Sugaru, who carried a halberd with a red banner that symbolized his authority. Sugaru enlisted the help of priests to enshrine the kami into a portable carriage, to be brought in the Emperor's presence, as a great serpent. Things took a turn for the worse as Yūryaku had neglected beforehand to practice proper ritual purification and religious abstinence. The thunder kami showed his displeasure through a thundering menacing appearance which caused the Emperor to flee into the interior of his palace. The great serpent was returned to Mimuro, and the Emperor made many offerings to appease the angry deity. (Note: This story also appears in "Shinto, the Ancient Religion of Japan" as well as several other books.)

== Historical assessment ==
Yūryaku is regarded by historians as a ruler during the 5th century whose existence is generally accepted as fact. Scholar Francis Brinkley lists Emperor Yūryaku under "Protohistoric sovereigns" where he remarks that while some historians have described him as an "austere" man, "few readers of his annals will be disposed to endure such a lenient verdict." He also added that the year 475 AD marks the first "absolute agreement between the dates given in Japanese history and those given in Korean…“ This in turn has caused critics to admit the trustworthiness of Japanese history in the late 5th century. Scottish Orientalist scholar and journalist James Murdoch regards Yūryaku as a "much maligned person who was a strong if somewhat ferocious ruler." British academic and author Richard Ponsonby-Fane noted that the Emperor is described as a "mighty hunter", as it is recorded that the God "Hitokotonushi" accompanied him in the chase.

The Emperor's interest in poetry is amongst the more well-documented aspects of his character and reign. Poems attributed to him are included in the Man'yōshū, and a number of his verses are preserved in the Kojiki and the Nihonshoki. Archaeological research has also confirmed that large keyhole-shaped tombs belonging to the chiefs of local ruling families disappeared from around the end of the 5th century when Yūryaku reigned.

A modern-day cognitive analysis, "as deciphered in the Nihon shoki", was conducted in 2024 by the National Institute of Japanese Literature. In this analysis, Emperor Yūryaku was included as an example of "impulsive murder and the tendency to become enraged." Factors such as "the disproportion between the triggering events", "the violence expressed by the emperor on such occasions (quite extreme in degree)", and the "frequent occurrence of such descriptions" were then considered for a conclusion. It is suggested that Emperor Yūryaku may have had an "intermittent explosive disorder, a type of Impulse-control disorder."

Outside of the Kiki, the reign of Emperor Kinmei (Note: The 29th Emperor) (c. 509 – 571 AD) is the first for which contemporary historiography has been able to assign verifiable dates. The conventionally accepted names and dates of the early Emperors were not confirmed as "traditional" until the reign of Emperor Kanmu (Note: Kanmu was the 50th sovereign of the imperial dynasty) between 737 and 806 AD.

=== Great King of Yamato ===
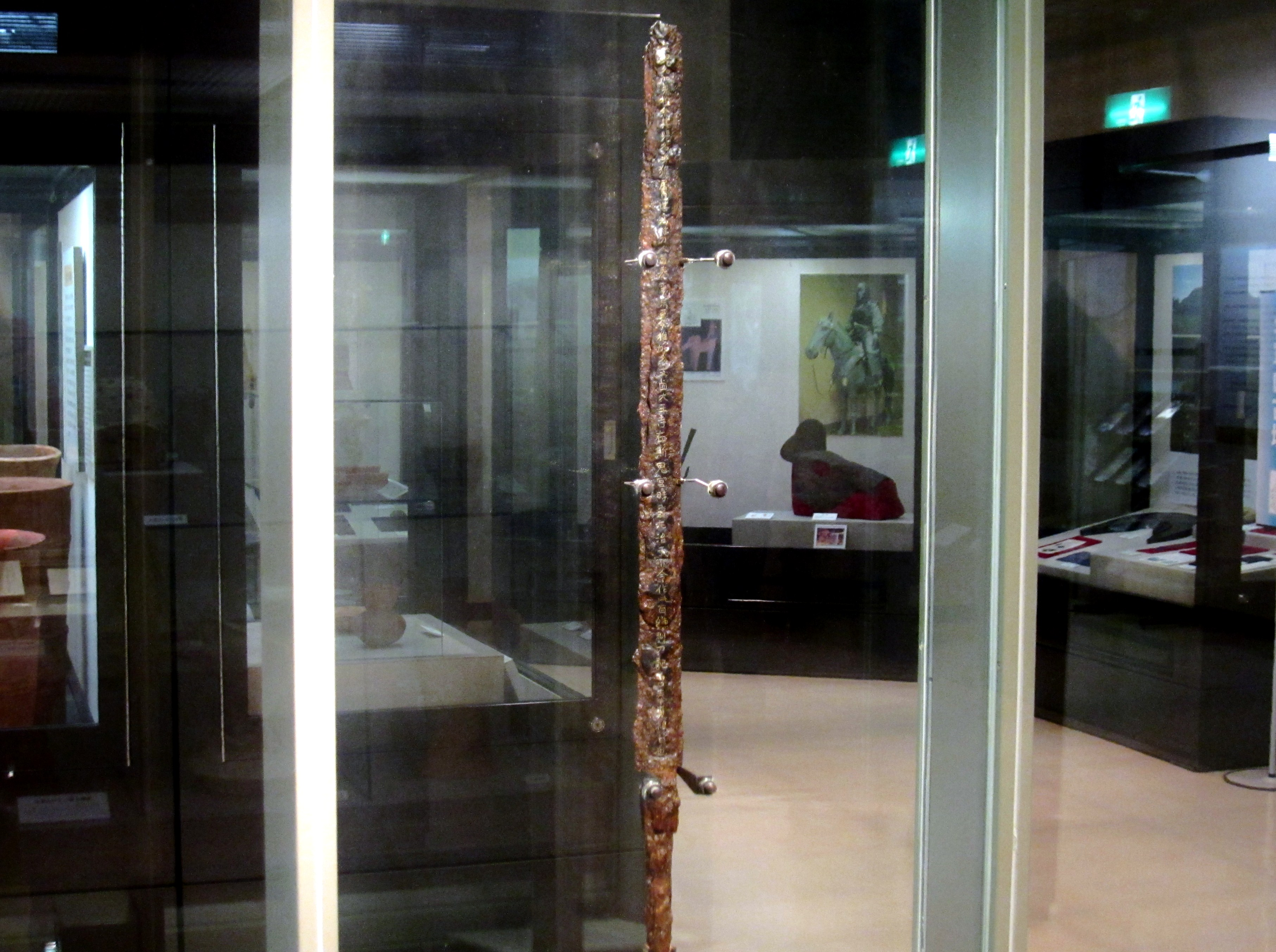
Inariyama Sword

During this moment in history, the calendar system of the Nihon Shoki changes from before and after Yūryaku's reign. As his name is mentioned at the beginning of the Man'yōshū and Nihon Ryōiki, this is seen as a historical turning point. Previously the Japanese archipelago had been a confederation of powerful ruling families from various regions. This appeared to have changed with the appearance of Emperor Yuryaku as the autocratic rule of the Great King was established and a centralized system centered on the Great King began. This is further supported by a major discovery that occurred in 1968 when the iron Inariyama burial-mound sword was extracted from a tomb. In 1978, X-ray analysis revealed a gold-inlaid inscription that comprises at least 115 Chinese characters. The given year on the sword is denoted as "xin-hai" ("Year of the Metal Pig") according to the Chinese sexagenary cycle, in which the name of the year is recycled every 60 years. While this year is generally regarded in Japan to correspond to 471 AD, at least one historian suggests that 531 is a more likely date.

The person buried in the tomb is given the name "Wowake", who was thought to be an influential warrior in the region. King Waka Takiru in the transcription is thought to be the same person as Ōhatsuse-wakatakeru-no-mikoto as mentioned in the Nihon Shoki, an alias of Emperor Yūryaku. As each inscription contains the name of an official position, this suggests that a system similar to the Bemin was already in place. While the Eta Funayama Sword also apparently mentions the name "Waka Takiru", many characters on that sword are illegible possibly due to polishing by a Japanese sword sharpener at the end of the Taisho period. If Yūryaku's name can be corroborated to this sword then it can be interpreted that the power of the Great King had already extended from Kyushu to Togoku by the latter half of the 5th century.

There is no evidence to suggest that the title tennō (meaning "emperor") was used during the time to which Yūryaku's reign has been assigned. Instead, his title could have possibly been Sumeramikoto or Amenoshita Shiroshimesu Ōkimi (治天下大王), meaning "the great king who rules all under heaven", or ヤマト大王/大君 "Great King of Yamato". The name Yūryaku-tennō was more than likely assigned to him posthumously by later generations. His name might have been regularized centuries after the lifetime ascribed to Yūryaku, possibly during the time in which legends about the origins of the imperial dynasty were compiled as the chronicles known today as the Kojiki.

=== King Bu ===
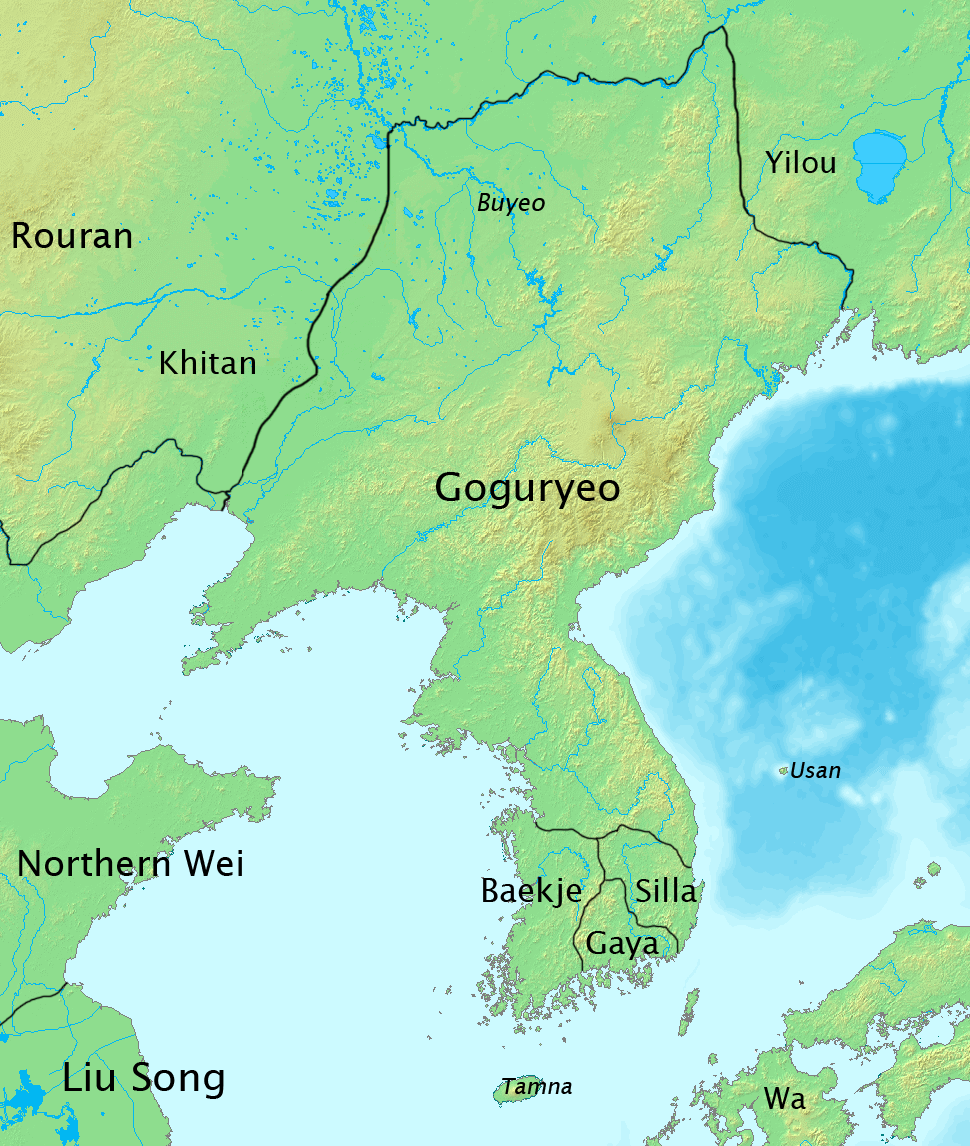
Goguryeo in 476 AD

It is theorized that Emperor Yūryaku may be synonymous with King Bu (武) as written in the Chinese records. According to the Book of Song, Bu dispatched envoys to Emperor Shun of Song (a Southern Chinese dynasty) in both 477 and 478 AD. The first envoy was to inform the Chinese emperor that King Kō (Emperor Ankō) had died, and his older brother had become king. It is written that he called himself "King of Wa", and the military commander of several different Kingdoms. It is written that in the following year Emperor Shun appointed Bu the title of Grand Peacekeeper-General of the East. The full context of this latter passage describes how Bu's ancestors conquered countries, and expanded their power to the east and west. It describes how they crossed the sea to the north and reached the southern part of the Korean Peninsula. Although the kings of Wa repeatedly requested that the Emperors of the Song dynasty recognize their military control over Baekje, their efforts were denied. The reason for this is thought to be that the Song dynasty placed importance on Baekje, which was located in a strategically important area. By not offering recognition the Song Emperors could put the Northern Wei in check, and avoid opposition from Goguryeo which was in conflict with Wa. Scholar Francis Brinkley notes that the power of the Koma clan (supported by the Liu Song dynasty) in Goguryeo increased steadily during this time. Brinkley suggests that Emperor Yūryaku's attempts to establish close relations with the Chinese Emperor seem to be from a desire to isolate Korea, which ended in failure.

The other two recorded instances regarding King Bu are mentioned in the books of Qi, and Liang. As compared to the former mention in 478 AD, these are not considered to be reliable. Japanese historian Mori Kimiaki points out that both of these appointments coincide with the founding year of their respective dynasties. This is thought to be an administrative matter, and it is not clear whether King Bu (Yūryaku) himself requested it or not. There is at least one theory that supports the envoy being sent to Southern Qi in 479 as being factual. This is solely based on the description in the title of Shoban Shokugu Illustrated Scrolls (諸番職貢図巻) included in Ainichi Ginro Sho Ga Zuroku (愛日吟盧書画続録). The fourth and final appointment allegedly made by King Bu (Yūryaku) falls outside of his recorded lifetime. As the Kiki states that Emperor Yūryaku died in 479, the last given year of 502 AD would be implausible.

=== Gravesite ===
While the actual site of Yūryaku's grave is not known, this regent is traditionally venerated at a memorial Shinto shrine (misasagi) in Habikino, Osaka. As designated by the Imperial Household Agency as Yūryaku's mausoleum, its formal name is Tajihi no Takawashi-no-hara no misasagi. Aside from this shrine in Osaka, there is another burial site named Kawachi Otsukayama Kofun (河内大塚山古墳) where Yūryaku is a possible burial candidate. Those in doubt of this theory, though, point to the construction style of the Kofun which may have begun several decades after Emperor Yūryaku's death. This has led some researchers to add Emperor Ankan as a burial candidate for the Kofun. Yūryaku is also enshrined at the Imperial Palace along with other emperors and members of the Imperial Family at the Three Palace Sanctuaries. He is additionally deified at the Katsuragi Ichigoshu Shrine (葛城一言主神社) in Gose, Nara.

== Consorts and children ==
=== Spouse/Concubine ===
Position	Name	Father	Issue
Empress (Kōgō)	Kusaka no Hatabi no hime (Note: The Nihon Shoki refers to her as "Kusaka no Hatahi hime" and mentions "Tachi-bana-hime" as another given name.) (草香幡梭姫皇女)	Emperor Nintoku	None
Consort (Hi)	Katsuragi no Karahime (葛城韓媛)	Katsuragi no Tsubura no Ōmi	• Prince Shiraka (白髪皇子) • Princess Taku-hata no Iratsume (栲幡姫皇女)
Consort (Hi)	Kibi no Wakahime (吉備稚媛; d.479)	Kibi no Kamitsumichi no Ōmi	• Prince Iwaki (磐城皇子) • Prince Hoshikawa no Wakamiya (星川稚宮皇子)
Consort (Hi)	Wani no Ōminagimi (和珥童女君)	Kasuga no Wani no Ōmi Fukame	• Princess Kasuga no Ōiratsume (春日大娘皇女)

=== Issue ===
Status	Name	Comments
Prince	Prince Shiraka (白髪皇子)	Shiraka became the next Emperor (Seinei).
Princess	Princess Taku-hata no Iratsume (栲幡姫皇女)	Also known as "Waka-tarashi-hime", she "attended to the sacrifices of the Great Deity of Ise" (Amaterasu). Taku was also a Saiō princess and died sometime in 459 AD.
Prince	Prince Iwaki (磐城皇子)	Iwaki died sometime between 479 and 481 AD.
Prince	Prince Hoshikawa no Wakamiya (星川稚宮皇子)	Wakamiya died sometime in 479 AD.
Princess	Princess Kasuga no Ōiratsume (春日大娘皇女)	Ōiratsume was later married to Emperor Ninken.

== Poetry ==
The first poem of the Man'yōshū said to have been composed by Yūryaku.

Japanese
Rōmaji
English

籠もよ み籠持ち
堀串もよ み堀串持ち
この岳に 菜摘ます児
家聞かな
告らさね
そらみつ 大和の国は
おしなべて 我こそ居れ
しきなべて 我こそ座せ
我こそば 告らめ
家をも名をも

Ko mo yo mi ko mochi
Fukushi mo yo mi fukushi mochi
Kono oka ni na tsumasu ko
Ie kikana
Norasane
Soramitsu Yamato no kuni wa
Oshinabete ware koso ore
Shikinabete ware koso mase
Ware koso ba norame
Ie o mo na o mo

Your basket, with your pretty basket,
Your trowel, with your little trowel,
Maiden, picking herbs on this hill-side,
I would ask you : Where is your home?
Will you not tell me your name ?
Over the spacious Land of Yamato
It is I who reign so wide and far,
It is I who rule so wide and far.
I myself, as your lord, will tell you
Of my home, and my name.

== See also ==
- Emperor of Japan
- List of Emperors of Japan
- Imperial cult

== Notes ==
Regnal titles
Preceded by Emperor Ankō	Emperor of Japan: Yūryaku; 456 – 479 (traditional dates)	Succeeded by Emperor Seinei
