= Emperor Hanzei =

Legendary emperor of Japan

Emperor Hanzei 反正天皇
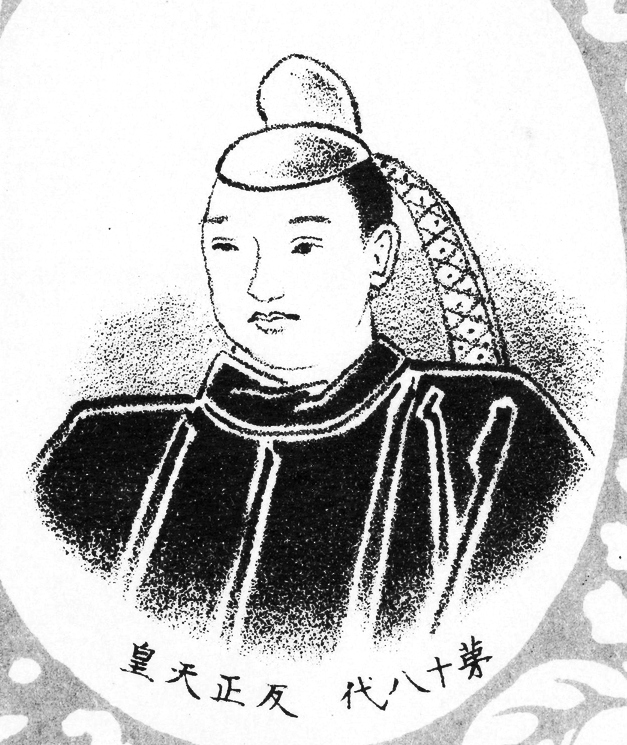

Emperor of Japan
- Reign: 406 – 410 (traditional)
- Predecessor: Richū
- Successor: Ingyō
- Born: 352
- Died: 410 (aged 59–60) (Note: The Kojiki states that Hanzei lived to the age of 60.)
- Burial: Mozu no Mimihara no Kita no misasagi (百舌鳥耳原北陵) (Osaka)
- Issue: Princess Kai-hime; Princess Tubura-hime; Princess Takara-hime; Prince Takabe
Posthumous name
- Chinese-style shigō: Emperor Hanzei (反正天皇) Japanese-style shigō: Mizuhawake no Sumeramikoto (瑞歯別天皇)
- House: Imperial House of Japan
- Father: Emperor Nintoku
- Mother: Iwano-hime
- Religion: Shinto

Emperor Hanzei (反正天皇, Hanzei-tennō) also known as Emperor Hansho, was the 18th Emperor of Japan, according to the traditional order of succession. Both the Kojiki, and the Nihon Shoki (collectively known as the Kiki) recorded events that took place during Hanzei's alleged lifetime. No firm dates can be assigned to this Emperor's life or reign, but he is conventionally considered to have reigned from 406 CE to 410 CE. His family included an "Imperial Lady", and "Concubine" which bore him 4 children. Historians have stated that while nothing remarkable took place during Hanzei's brief reign, he did have ranked concubines which is an introduced Chinese custom.

Hanzei died sometime in 410 AD without naming an heir to the throne which caused Imperial ministers to name a successor. While the location of Hanzei's grave is unknown, he is traditionally venerated at a memorial Shinto tomb. Modern historians have come to the conclusion that the title of "Emperor" and the name "Hanzei" were used by later generations to describe him. There is also a general consensus regarding Hanzei's factual existence. (Note: Although Hanzei existed as a non-legendary figure, almost no facts are known about his actual life.)

== Protohistoric narrative ==
The Japanese have traditionally accepted this sovereign's historical existence, and a mausoleum (misasagi) for Hanzei is currently maintained. The following information available is taken from the pseudo-historical Kojiki and Nihon Shoki, which are collectively known as Kiki (記紀) or Japanese chronicles. These chronicles include legends and myths, as well as potential historical facts that have since been exaggerated and/or distorted over time. It's recorded in the Kiki that Hanzei was born to Princess Iwa (磐之媛命, Iwa no hime no Mikoto) sometime in 352 AD, and was given the name Mizuhawake (瑞歯別). He was the third son of Emperor Nintoku, and a younger brother of Emperor Richū. The phrase Mizu ha in the name Mizuhawake translates to beautiful teeth, as he was said to have beautiful "exceptionally large" "teeth like one bone" all of the same size. Only the Kojiki mentions the alleged full grown height of Emperor Hanzei which is said to have been 9 ft 2.5 in (2.81 m). Shortly after Nintoku died, his elder brother Prince Suminoe no Nakatsu (住吉仲皇子) attempted to assassinate his eldest brother Prince Ōenoizahowake (大兄去来穂別尊) (Richū). Mizuhawake was able to bribe one of Nakatsu's retainers into killing Nakatsu in order to prove his loyalty to the future emperor.

According to the Nihon Shoki, Richū bypassed his own children to make his younger brother Mizuhawake crown prince in 401 AD. The given reason is that a Tajihi flower fell into a well which gave the name of Mizuhawake as the next heir to be. Mizuhawake was proclaimed as "Emperor Hanzei" upon Richū's death in 405 AD, and was enthroned sometime in the following year. Shortly after his enthronement Hanzei took Tsuno-hime (津野媛) as an "Imperial concubine", and eventually her younger sister Oto-hime (弟媛) as a consort. The two Empresses bore him 4 children which consisted of 2 sons and 2 daughters. During Emperor Hanzei's reign, he ruled from the palace Shibagaki no Miya at Tajihi in the province of Kawachi (present-day Matsubara, Osaka). During his five-year reign the country enjoyed a time of peace. Emperor Hanzei died peacefully in his palace sometime in 410 AD without naming an heir (crown prince). This issue was later settled by Imperial ministers who selected Emperor Nintoku's youngest son Ingyō as the next emperor.

== Historical assessment ==
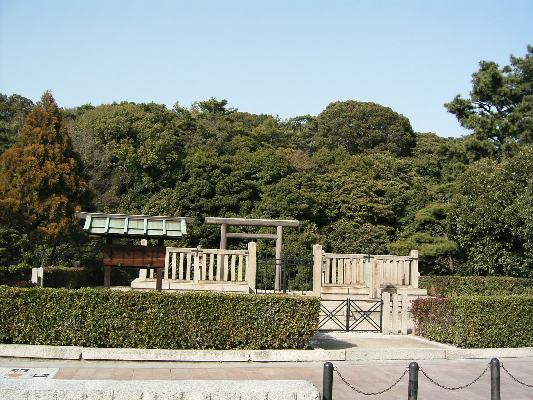
Memorial Shinto shrine and mausoleum honoring Emperor Hanzei

Hanzei is regarded by historians as a ruler during the early 5th century whose existence is generally accepted as fact. Scholar Francis Brinkley lists Emperor Hanzei under "Protohistoric sovereigns", but notes that his short reign was "not remarkable for anything" except for indirect evidence that Chinese customs were beginning to be adopted by the Japanese court. Scholar William George Aston notes in his translation of the Nihon Shoki that "three ranks of concubines are mentioned", which at the time were of Chinese origin (ranked concubines). Others such as author Ryoichi Maenosono (Kokushi Daijiten) identify Emperor Hanzei with "King Chin of the Five kings of Wa. According to Chinese records, King Chin sent a tribute to the Liu Song dynasty in 438 AD. (Note: The Kiki has no mentions of diplomatic relations with China during this time.)

British academic and Japanologist Basil Hall Chamberlain notes in his translation of the Kojiki that no accurate information exists regarding the ancient Japanese measures used to get Hanzei's alleged height of 9 ft 2.5 in (2.81 m). He went on to say that "the English equivalents used in this passage correspond but approximately to the modern Japanese standards". As for Hanzei's ascension, the Nihon Shoki mentions that Tajihi is now known as the itadori flower. Aston notes though, that the story of a Tajihi flower falling into a well is inconsistent with a later passage in the Nihon Shoki which refers to Tajihi as a location (not a flower).

There is no evidence to suggest that the title tennō was used during the time to which Hanzei's reign has been assigned. Rather, it was presumably Sumeramikoto or Amenoshita Shiroshimesu Ōkimi (治天下大王), meaning "the great king who rules all under heaven". An alternate title could have also been ヤマト大王/大君 "Great King of Yamato". The name Hanzei-tennō was more than likely assigned to him posthumously by later generations. His name might have been regularized centuries after the lifetime ascribed to Hanzei, possibly during the time in which legends about the origins of the imperial dynasty were compiled as the chronicles known today as the Kojiki.

While the actual site of Hanzei's grave is not known, this regent is traditionally venerated at a kofun-type Imperial tomb in Sakai, Osaka. The Imperial Household Agency designates this location as Hanzei's mausoleum, and is formally named formally named Mozu no mimihara no kita no misasagi (百舌鳥耳原北陵). Outside of the Kiki, the reign of Emperor Kinmei (Note: The 29th Emperor) (c. 509 – 571 AD) is the first for which contemporary historiography has been able to assign verifiable dates. The conventionally accepted names and dates of the early Emperors were not confirmed as "traditional" though, until the reign of Emperor Kanmu (Note: Kanmu was the 50th sovereign of the imperial dynasty) between 737 and 806 AD.

== Consorts and children ==
=== Imperial Lady/Concubine ===
Position	Name	Father	Issue
Imperial Lady (皇夫人)	Tsuno-hime (津野媛)	Ooyake no omi Kogoto (大宅臣木事)	• Princess Kai-hime (香火姫皇女) • Princess Tubura-hime (円皇女)
Consort (Kōkyū)	Oto-hime (弟媛)	Ooyake no omi Kogoto (大宅臣木事)	• Princess Takara-hime (財皇女) • Prince Takabe (高部皇子)

=== Issue ===
Status	Name	Mother	Comments
Princess	Kai-hime (香火姫)	Tsuno-hime (津野媛)	Its unknown if the province of Kahi (Kai) is connected to this princess.
Princess	Tubura-hime (円)	Tsuno-hime (津野媛)	"The meaning of Tsubura is obscure."
Princess	Takara-hime (財)	Oto-hime (弟媛)	The name "Takara" symbolically means treasure.
Prince	Takabe (高部)	Oto-hime (弟媛)	Takabe presumably died young.

== Ancestry ==
Ancestors of Emperor Hanzei

8. Emperor Chūai (legendary)
4. Emperor Ōjin
9. Empress Jingū (legendary)
2. Emperor Nintoku
10. Prince Iokiiribiko
5. Nakatsu-hime
11. Kanataya no hime
1. Emperor Hanzei
6. Kazuraki no Sotsuhiko
3. Princess Iwa

== See also ==
Japanese Imperial kamon — a stylized chrysanthemum blossom

- Emperor of Japan
- List of Emperors of Japan
- Imperial cult
- Five kings of Wa

== Notes ==
Regnal titles
Preceded by Emperor Richū	Emperor of Japan: Hanzei; 406–410 (traditional dates)	Succeeded by Emperor Ingyō
