= Kokushi Daijiten =

Multivolume Japanese history dictionary

The Kokushi Daijiten (国史大辞典 literally "Great Dictionary of National History") [Call no.: REF DS 833 .K64, ISBN 4-642-00501-3 (Vol. 1)] is a large, general history dictionary of Japan published by the Tokyo-based company Yoshikawa Kobunkan. The original edition consisted of six volumes and was published in 1927. The current edition was written and released over a period of 18 years, beginning in 1979 and ending in 1997.

== General ==
The Kokushi Daijiten consists of a total of 14 volumes of entries in addition to three index volumes (numbered as vol. 15 upper, middle, and lower). A remarkable feature of the dictionary is the inclusion of large, high-quality glossy color plates and maps in addition to black and white illustrations that accompany entries in the text.

== Organization ==
The dictionary is organized following the Japanese phonetic syllabary beginning with "a", as opposed to the iroha order. Entries are titled in hiragana or katakana as appropriate, then followed by kanji or Western letters when applicable. Each entry is signed by its author, usually an academic expert in a related field.

== Index ==
The three-volume index is separated by type of entry. The first ("upper") volume contains a supplement containing entries not included in the writing of the original volumes, as well as indexes for historical events (shiryô) and place names (chimei). The second volume is an index of people's names (jinmei), and volume three is an index for "topics" (jikô). Each index entry (which are listed in kanji) contains the volume number, page, and line on which the term appears, as well as the title of the entry under which it appears.

== Reception ==
One criticism often leveled against the Kokushi Daijiten is that since it was written over the course of nearly twenty years and released volume by volume in syllabary order, some information from the early volumes has already become outdated. It is generally considered on the slightly conservative side, which makes it less imaginative than its competitors, such as the Heibonsha Nihonshi Daijiten, but by the same token, factually reliable.
