= Jeonji of Baekje =

18th King of Baekje (r. 405–420)

- Hangul: 부여영
- Hanja: 扶餘映
- RR: Buyeo Yeong
- MR: Puyŏ Yŏng

Monarch name
- Hangul: 전지왕, 직지왕, 진지왕
- Hanja: 腆支王, 直支王, 眞支王
- RR: Jeonjiwang, Jikjiwang, Jinjiwang
- MR: Chŏnjiwang, Chikchiwang, Chinjiwang

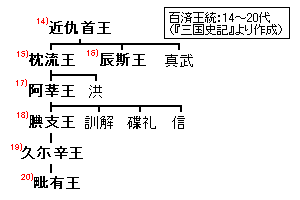
the genealogy of Baekje( 14th King ~ 20th King)

Jeonji (died 420) (r. 405–420) was the eighteenth king of Baekje, one of the Three Kingdoms of Korea.

As the eldest son, he was confirmed as successor to King Asin, in 394. His queen was Lady Palsu of the Hae clan.

Jeonji spent much of his youth in the Wa kingdom of Yamato Japan as hostage, going there in 397. Upon his father's death, he returned home to find that his uncle Seollye had murdered Hunhae, Asin's other brother, and usurped the throne. Hae Chung, an inhabitant of Hanseong, warned him not to enter the capital. Shortly thereafter, Seollye was killed and Jeonji made king. Presumably out of gratitude for this, Jeonji made several members of the Hae clan ministers, as well as marrying Lady Palso of the Hae clan. This put an end to the royal family's close ties to the Jin clan.

The traditional dates of Jeonji's rule are based on the Samguk sagi. On the basis of more contemporaneous Chinese records, Best (1979) has suggested that the years 405–414 are more plausible.

According to the Samguk sagi, in 406 Baekje sent a tribute mission to the Chinese court of Eastern Jin. It is the first mention of such a mission in more than twenty years, and may indicate that the country had become more secure against Goguryeo. It would have been typical to send such an embassy to inform the Chinese court that a new king had taken power. However, this visit is not confirmed by Chinese sources. In 416 Jin sent envoys to grant the title "General Stabilizing the East" to Jeonji (Yeo Yeong).

== Family ==
- Father: Asin of Baekje
- Mother: name unknown – from Jin clan.
  - Younger sister: Shinjedo (新齊都媛, ?–?), King Jeonji sent his younger sister to Emperor Ojin to wait on him along with 7 maids during the 39th year of Ōjin's reign. She was naturalized in Japan where they called her Shisetsuhime.
  - Half-brother: Buyeo Sin (扶餘信, ?–429) – first appointed in February, 407 as Minister of the Interior (Naesin-jwa'pyeong, 内臣佐平) then elected in 408 as chief minister (Sang-jwa'pyeong, 上佐平) which he held through the reign of three kings.
- Consorts and their respective issue(s):
1. Lady Palsu, of the Hae clan (팔수부인; 八須夫人)
  1. Guisin of Baekje (久爾辛王, ?–427) – 19th King of Baekje.
2. Unknown concubine
  1. Biyu of Baekje – 20th King of Baekje (according to the Samguk sagi, Biyu was an illegitimate son of Jeonji, while other sources name Biyu as Guisin's son. It is not known which sources are right.)

== See also ==
- History of Korea
- List of Monarchs of Korea

Jeonji of Baekje House of Buyeo Cadet branch of the House of Go Died: 420
Regnal titles
Preceded by Asin	King of Baekje; 405–420	Succeeded by Guisin
