= Emperor Nintoku =

Legendary emperor of Japan

Emperor Nintoku 仁徳天皇
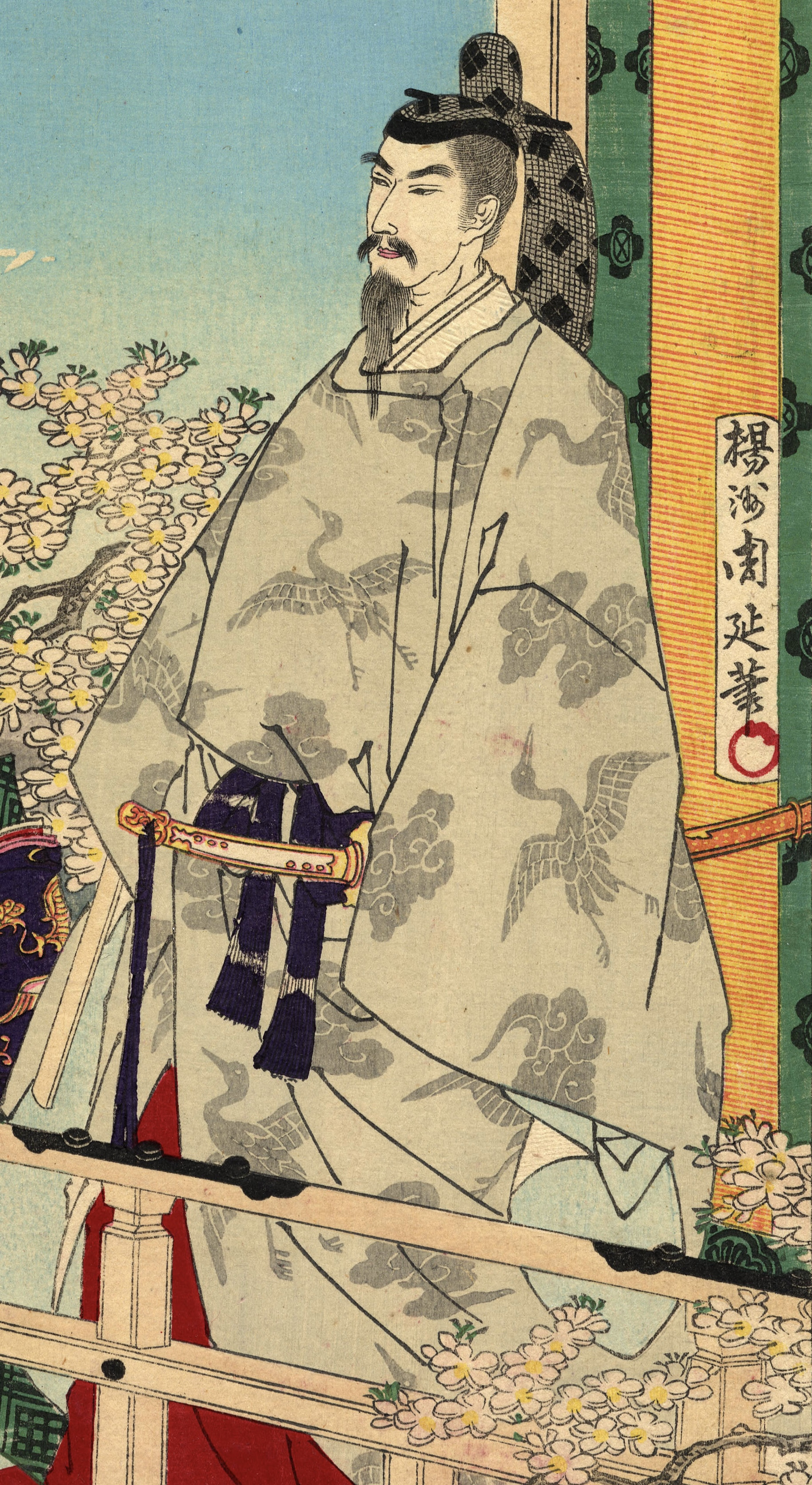
- Woodblock print by Toyohara Chikanobu, 1886

Emperor of Japan
- Reign: 313–399 (traditional)
- Predecessor: Ōjin
- Successor: Richū
- Born: Ohosazaki no Mikoto (大鷦鷯尊); 290
- Died: 399 (aged 108–109)
- Burial: Mozu no Mimihara no naka no misasagi (百舌鳥耳原中陵) (Osaka)
- Spouses: Iwanohime-no-Mikoto; Princess Yata
- Issue among others...: Emperor Richū
Posthumous name
- Chinese-style shigō: Emperor Nintoku (仁徳天皇) Japanese-style shigō: Ohosazaki no Sumeramikoto (大鷦鷯天皇)
- House: Imperial House of Japan
- Father: Emperor Ōjin
- Mother: Nakatsu-hime
- Religion: Shinto

Emperor Nintoku (仁徳天皇, Nintoku-tennō), also known as Ohosazaki no Sumeramikoto (大鷦鷯天皇) was the 16th Emperor of Japan, according to the traditional order of succession. Due to his reputation for goodness derived from depictions in the Kojiki and Nihon Shoki, he is sometimes referred to as the Saint Emperor (聖帝, Hijiri-no-mikado).

While his existence is generally accepted as fact, no firm dates can be assigned to Nintoku's life or reign. He is traditionally considered to have reigned from 313 to 399, although these dates are doubted by scholars.

== Legendary narrative ==
The Japanese have traditionally accepted Nintoku's historical existence, and a mausoleum (misasagi) for Nintoku is currently maintained. The following information available is taken from the pseudo-historical Kojiki and Nihon Shoki, which are collectively known as Kiki (記紀) or Japanese chronicles. These chronicles include legends and myths, as well as potential historical facts that have since been exaggerated and/or distorted over time. The Kiki states that Nintoku was born to Nakatsuhime no Mikoto (仲姫命) sometime in 290 AD, and was given the name Ohosazaki no Mikoto (大鷦鷯尊). According to the Nihon Shoki, he was the fourth son of Emperor Ōjin.

== Known information ==
Nintoku is regarded by historians as a ruler during the early 5th century whose existence is generally accepted as fact without attributing all of the things he allegedly accomplished. Nintoku's contemporary title would not have been tennō, as most historians believe this title was not introduced until the reigns of Emperor Tenmu and Empress Jitō. Rather, it was presumably Sumeramikoto or Amenoshita Shiroshimesu Ōkimi (治天下大王), meaning "the great king who rules all under heaven". Alternatively, Nintoku might have been referred to as ヤマト大王/大君 or the "Great King of Yamato". The name "Nintoku" also might have been regularized centuries after the lifetime ascribed to him, possibly during the time in which legends about the origins of the imperial dynasty were compiled as the chronicles known today as the Kojiki.

Although the Nihon Shoki states that Nintoku ruled from 313 to 399, research suggests the dates in this time period are likely inaccurate. For example, William George Aston points out Nintoku's prime minister Takenouchi no Sukune's reported birth in the ninth year of Emperor Keikō and death in the 78th year of Nintoku, which would have made him 312 years old. Outside of the Kiki, the reign of Emperor Kinmei (Note: The 29th Emperor) (c. 509 – 571 AD) is the first for which contemporary historiography has been able to assign verifiable dates. The conventionally accepted names and dates of the early Emperors were not confirmed as "traditional" though, until the reign of Emperor Kanmu (Note: Kanmu was the 50th sovereign of the imperial dynasty) between 737 and 806 AD.

Hidehiro Okada identifies him with Dei of Wa, a king who preceded the better known Five kings of Wa.

== Consorts and children ==
According to the Nihon Shoki, he was the fourth son of Emperor Ōjin and his mother was Nakatsuhime no Mikoto (仲姫命), a great-granddaughter of Emperor Keikō. He was also the father of Emperors Richū, Hanzei, and Ingyō. His name was Ohosazaki no Mikoto (大鷦鷯尊).

Empress (Kōgō): Princess Iwa (磐之媛命), poet and daughter of Katsuragi no Sotsuhiko (葛城襲津彦) (first)

- First Son: Prince Ōenoizahowake (大兄去来穂別尊), later Emperor Richū
- Prince Suminoe no Nakatsu (住吉仲皇子; d.399)
- Third Son: Prince Mizuhawake (瑞歯別尊), later Emperor Hanzei
- Fourth Son: Prince Oasatsuma Wakugo no Sukune (雄朝津間稚子宿禰尊), later Emperor Ingyō
- Prince Sakoudo (酒人王)

Empress (Kōgō): Princess Yata (八田皇女), Emperor Ōjin's daughter (second)

Consort (Hi) : Himuka no Kaminaga-hime (日向髪長媛), Morokata no Kimi Ushimoroi's daughter

- Prince Ookusaka (大草香皇子; d.454)
- Princess Kusaka no hatabi-hime (草香幡梭姫皇女), married to Emperor Yūryaku

Consort: Uji no Wakiiratsume (宇遅之若郎女), daughter of Emperor Ōjin

Consort: Kuro-hime (黒日売), daughter of Kibi no Amabe no Atai (吉備海部直)

== Nintoku's tomb ==
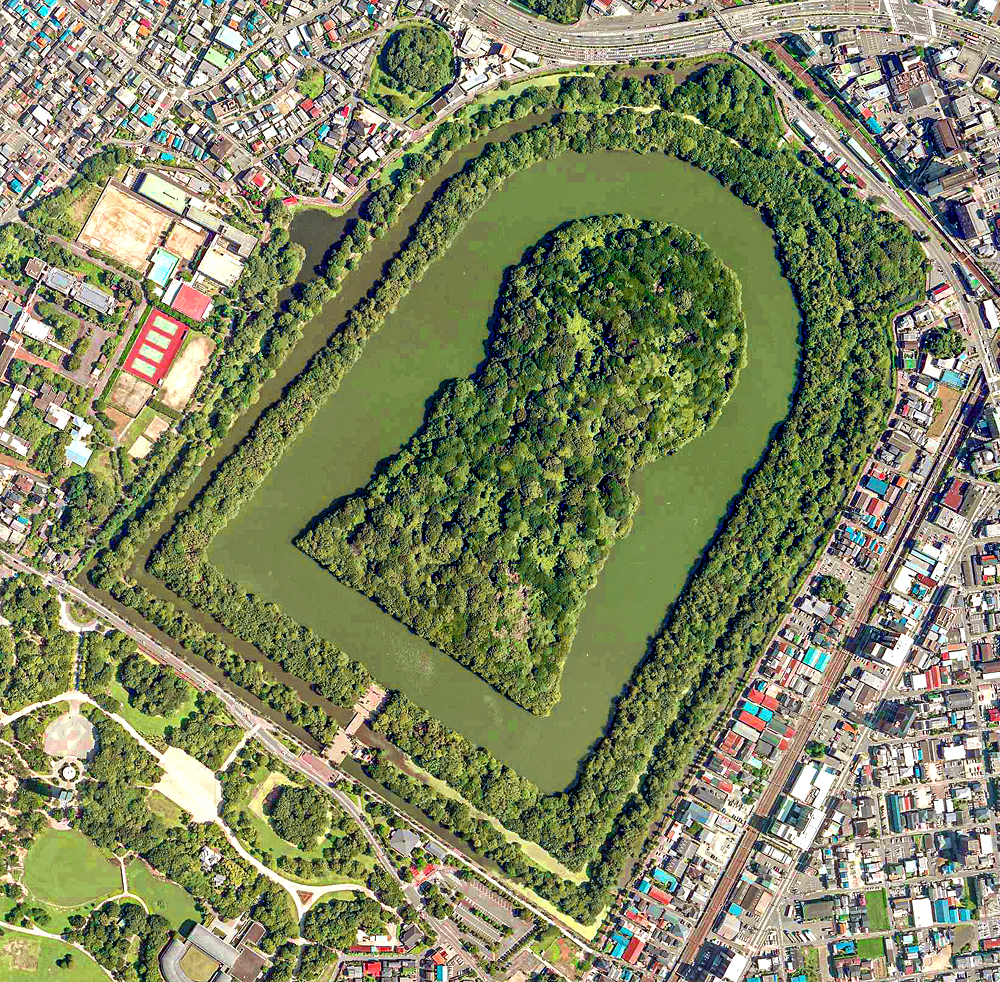
Daisen-Kofun, the tomb of Emperor Nintoku, Osaka

Daisen Kofun (the largest tomb in Japan) in Sakai, Osaka, is considered to be his final resting place. The actual site of Nintoku's grave is not known.

The Nintoku-ryo tumulus is one of almost 50 tumuli collectively known as "Mozu Kofungun" clustered around the city, and covers the largest area of any tomb in the world. Built in the middle of the 5th century by an estimated 2,000 men working daily for almost 16 years, the Nintoku tumulus, at 486 meters long and with a mound 35 meters high, is twice as long as the base of the famous Great Pyramid of Pharaoh Khufu (Cheops) in Giza.

The Imperial tomb of Nintoku's consort, Iwa-no hime no Mikoto, is said to be located in Saki-cho, Nara City. Both kofun-type Imperial tombs are characterized by a keyhole-shaped island located within a wide, water-filled moat. Imperial tombs and mausolea are cultural properties; but they are guarded and administered by the Imperial Household Agency (IHA), which is the government department responsible for all matters relating to the Emperor and his family. According to the IHA, the tombs are more than a mere repository for historical artifacts; they are sacred religious sites. IHA construes each of the Imperial grave sites as sanctuaries for the spirits of the ancestors of the Imperial House.

Nintoku is traditionally venerated at a memorial Shinto shrine (misasagi) at Osaka. The Imperial Household Agency designates this location as his mausoleum. It is formally named Mozu no Mimihara no naka no misasagi.

== See also ==
- Emperor of Japan
- List of Emperors of Japan
- Imperial cult
- Five kings of Wa
- Kōzu-gū
- Ujigami Shrine

== Notes ==
Regnal titles
Preceded by Emperor Ōjin	Emperor of Japan: Nintoku; 313–399 (traditional dates)	Succeeded by Emperor Richū
