= Emperor Richū =

17th Emperor of Japan

Emperor Richū 履中天皇
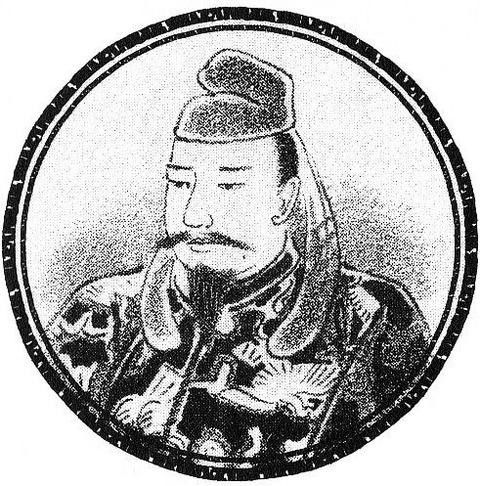

Emperor of Japan
- Reign: 400–405 (traditional)
- Predecessor: Nintoku
- Successor: Hanzei
- Born: 336
- Died: 405 (aged 68–69) (Note: According to the Nihon Shoki, Emperor Richū lived to the age of 70. While the Kojiki says he lived to the age of 64, this number is likely inaccurate.)
- Burial: Mozu no Mimihara no Minami no misasagi (百舌鳥耳原南陵) (Osaka)
- Spouse: Kusakanohatabino-hime
- Issue among others...: Ichinobe no Oshiwa
Posthumous name
- Chinese-style shigō: Emperor Richū (履中天皇) Japanese-style shigō: Ōenoizahowake no Sumeramikoto (去来穂別天皇)
- House: Imperial House of Japan
- Father: Emperor Nintoku
- Mother: Iwano-hime
- Religion: Shinto

Emperor Richū (履中天皇, Richū-tennō), also known as Ōenoizahowake no Mikoto (大兄去来穂別尊) was the 17th Emperor of Japan, according to the traditional order of succession. Both the Kojiki, and the Nihon Shoki (collectively known as the Kiki) recorded events that took place during Richū's alleged lifetime. This emperor is best known for an assassination attempt on his life by his brother Suminoe after the death of their father Emperor Nintoku. Although no firm dates can be assigned to his life, Richū's brief reign is conventionally considered to have been from 400 to 405.

During his reign local recorders were allegedly appointed for the first time in various provinces, a royal treasury was established, and court waitresses (Uneme) first appeared. Richū had both a wife and a concubine during his lifetime which bore him 4 children (2 boys and 2 girls). None of his children would inherit the throne as Richū appointed the title of crown prince to his other brother Mizuhawake. Richū allegedly died sometime in 405 at the age of 70, and his brother Mizuhawake was crowned as Emperor Hanzei in the following year. While the location of Richū's grave is unknown, he is traditionally venerated at a memorial Shinto tomb. Modern historians have come to the conclusion that the title of "Emperor" and the name "Richū" were used by later generations to describe him. There is also a general consensus that Richū was not a legendary figure.

== Protohistoric narrative ==
The Japanese have traditionally accepted this sovereign's historical existence, and a mausoleum (misasagi) for Richū is currently maintained. The following information available is taken from the pseudo-historical Kojiki and Nihon Shoki, which are collectively known as Kiki (記紀) or Japanese chronicles. These chronicles include legends and myths, as well as potential historical facts that have since been exaggerated and/or distorted over time. These records state that Richū was born to Princess Iwa (磐之媛命, Iwa no hime no Mikoto) sometime in 336 AD, and was given the name Ōenoizahowake no Mikoto (大兄去来穂別尊). He was the eldest son of Emperor Nintoku, and was later appointed crown prince by his father during the 31st year of his father's reign. (343 AD). When Nintoku died in 399 AD, a period of mourning was followed by a scandal that almost took the Crown Prince's life.

=== Assassination attempt ===
Sometime during the interval before Richū assumed the throne, he sent his younger brother, Prince Suminoe no Nakatsu (住吉仲皇子) to make marriage arrangements for his consort Kuro-hime (黒媛). Prince Nakatsu instead passed himself off as his older brother Richū, and seduced Kuro-hime. When the act was done he carelessly left his wrist-bells behind at Kuro-hime's house. Richū later discovered these during his first visit to her house, assumed what his brother had done, but decided to take no action against him. Nakatsu on the other hand was fearful of his scandalous actions and plotted to kill his brother that night. He secretly raised a small group of people who surrounded his brother's palace. Luckily for Richū, some of his loyal retainers intervened by rescuing the heir and carrying him off to Isonokami Shrine in Yamoto. Nakatsu meanwhile set fire to the besieged palace not knowing of his brother's escape.

Richū's other younger brother Prince Mizuhawake (瑞歯別尊) (later Emperor Hanzei) followed him to Yamoto. He was told by Richū though, that unless he proved his loyalty by killing Nakatsu he could not be trusted. Mizuhawake returned to Naniwa and bribed one of Nakatsu's retainers to kill him. Nakatsu was utterly defenseless and unprepared as he assumed his brother had fled and disappeared. He was subsequently stabbed to death by his retainer, and Mizuhawake made his way back to Yamoto to report his death. Richū in turn gratefully granted his younger brother "Mura-ahase granaries.

=== Reign ===
Richū was crowned emperor after his brother's failed rebellion had been put to rest in the following year (400 AD). During this time, those who were not executed for their participation in the rebellion were forced to undergo tattooing as a punishment. Kurohime was also officially appointed as a concubine later in that year. Although the two had two sons and a daughter, Richū appointed the title of "Crown Prince" to his brother Prince Mizuhawake (later Emperor Hanzei) in 401 AD. In the year 403 AD, "local recorders were appointed for the first time in various provinces, who noted down statements and communicated writings of the four quarters." Kurohime died sometime in the following year (404 AD) under unclear circumstances. Its said that the Emperor heard a voice in the wind utter mysterious words in the "great void" before a messenger announced of her death. Richū attributed the cause to an offended deity due to the misconduct of an official regarding a shrine. Princess Kusakanohatabino-hime was appointed empress in the following year (405 AD), and the two gave birth to a daughter (Princess Nakashi). A royal treasury was also established in that year which was managed by two appointed Koreans. Emperor Richū's reign ended during its sixth year, when he fell ill and succumbed to disease at the age of 64 or 70. The kiki states that Richū was buried in the misasagi on the "Plain of Mozo no Mimi". His brother Mizuhawake was enthroned as the next emperor in the following year (406 AD).

== Historical assessment ==
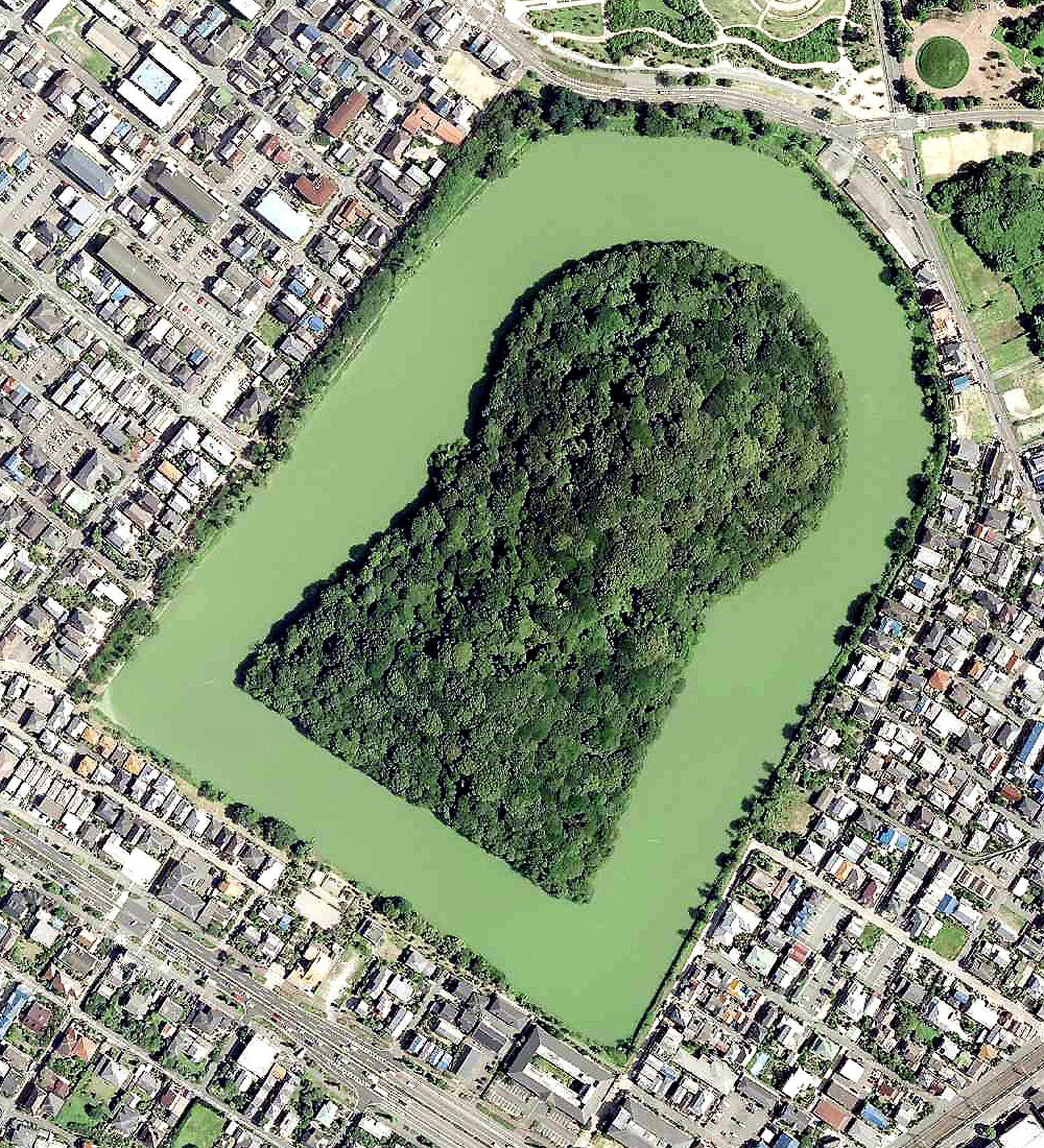
Emperor Richū is traditionally associated with this kamiishizu misanzai in Sakai.

Richū is regarded by historians as a ruler during the early 5th century whose existence is generally accepted as fact. Orientalist scholar James Murdoch includes Emperor Richū in the "earliest non-legendary" sovereigns of Japan, while academic Richard Ponsonby-Fane stated that this "may be termed the semi-historical period". Scholar Francis Brinkley lists Emperor Richū under "Protohistoric sovereigns", and notes that rulers from this point forward no longer have reigns of "incredible length". Others such as author Joshua Frydman cite Emperor Richū's lifespan as being realistic in length. Richū has also been possibly identified with King San in the Book of Song by Confucian scholars Kenrin Matsushita (松下見林) and Arai Hakuseki. According to Chinese records, King San sent messengers to the Liu Song dynasty at least twice in 421 and 425. (Note: The Kiki has no mentions of diplomatic relations with China during this time.)

Scholars William George Aston and Brinkley disagree on the introduction of local recorders. Aston states in his reasoning that the arrival of the Korean scholar Wani did not take place until 405 AD, and "[historians] have not yet got down to time of accurate chronologically". Brinkley counters this by saying that Wani's innovation was "not the art of writing, but, in all probability, a knowledge of the Chinese classics". Academic Delmer Brown wrote that during Richū's reign, court waitresses (Uneme) appeared. There were also storehouses (Kura) built in various provinces, and an "Administrator of State Affairs" from his reign on. It is commonly accepted among historians that Emperor Richū was in his late 60s if not 70 when he died.

There is no evidence to suggest that the title tennō was used during the time to which Richū's reign has been assigned. It is certainly possible that he was a chieftain or local clan leader, and that the polity he ruled would have only encompassed a small portion of modern-day Japan. It's also possible he could have had the title of Sumeramikoto or Amenoshita Shiroshimesu Ōkimi (治天下大王), meaning "the great king who rules all under heaven", or ヤマト大王/大君 "Great King of Yamato". The name Richū-tennō was more than likely assigned to him posthumously by later generations. His name might have been regularized centuries after the lifetime ascribed to Richū, possibly during the time in which legends about the origins of the imperial dynasty were compiled as the chronicles known today as the Kojiki.

While the actual site of Richū's grave is not known, this regent is traditionally venerated at a kofun-type Imperial tomb in Sakai, Osaka. The Imperial Household Agency designates this location as Richū's mausoleum, and is formally named Mozumimihara Minamisagi (百舌鳥耳原南陵). It is also identified as the Kami Ishizu Misanzai (上石津ミサンザイ古墳) kofun. Outside of the Kiki, the reign of Emperor Kinmei (Note: The 29th Emperor) (c. 509 – 571 AD) is the first for which contemporary historiography has been able to assign verifiable dates. The conventionally accepted names and dates of the early Emperors were not confirmed as "traditional" though, until the reign of Emperor Kanmu (Note: Kanmu was the 50th sovereign of the imperial dynasty) between 737 and 806 AD.

== Consorts and children ==
=== Concubine/Spouse ===
Position	Name	Father	Issue
Concubine	Kuro-hime (黒媛)	Katsuragi no Ashita no Sukune	• Prince Ichinobe no Oshiwa (磐坂市辺押磐皇子) • Prince Mima (御馬皇子) • Princess Aomi no Himemiko (青海皇女) (disputed)
Empress (Kōgō)	Kusakanohatabino-hime (草香幡梭皇女)	Emperor Ōjin	• Princess Nakashi no Hime (中磯皇女)

=== Issue ===
Status	Name	Mother	Comments
First Son (Prince)	Ichinobe no Oshiwa (磐坂市辺押磐皇子)	Kuro-hime (黒媛)	Ichinobe was the father of Emperor Kenzō and Emperor Ninken, he allegedly died sometime in 456 AD (Note: The dates given here are not confirmed.)
Prince	Mima no Miko (御馬皇子)	Kuro-hime (黒媛)	Prince Mima allegedly died sometime in 456 AD
Princess	Aomi no Himemiko (青海皇女)	Kuro-hime (黒媛) or Hae-hime (荑媛)	Aomi no Himemiko is also referred to as "Empress (Regnant) Iitoyo" (飯豊天皇 Iitoyo-tennō) in the Fusō Ryakuki and the Honchō Kōin Jōun-roku, a 12th-century and a 15th-century history respectively. As the Nihon Shoki and Kojiki disagree on her relationship to Emperor Richū, she could have also been the daughter of Prince Ichinobe no Oshiwa. This is supported by her alleged lifespan of 440 to 485 AD which would have occurred after Richū's death in 405 AD.
Princess	Nakashi no Hime (中磯皇女)	Kusakanohatabino (草香幡梭皇女)	Nakashi was married to Prince Ookusaka (Note: Ookusaka was one of Emperor Nintoku's sons) and then later to Emperor Ankō.

== See also ==
- Emperor of Japan
- List of Emperors of Japan
- Imperial cult

== Notes ==
Regnal titles
Preceded by Emperor Nintoku	Emperor of Japan: Richū; 400–405 (traditional dates)	Succeeded by Emperor Hanzei
