= Ichinobe no Oshiwa =

Japanese prince of Kofun period

Ichinobe-no Oshiwa (磐坂市邊押磐, mid-5th century-456) was the eldest son of Japanese Emperor Richū; and he was the father of Prince Woke (袁祁王), and Prince Oke (億計). They would later become known as Emperor Kenzō and Emperor Ninken. His wife was Wae-hime.

No firm dates can be assigned to the lives or reigns of this period, but the reign of Emperor Ankō is considered to have lasted from 456 to 479; and Oshiwa died during Ankō's reign.

== Traditional history ==
According to the Nihonshoki, Oshiwa was killed in a hunting accident by Emperor Yūryaku. His sons were adopted as heirs by Emperor Seinei. They are known as Prince Woke (or Kenzō-tennō) and as Prince Oke (or Ninken-tennō).
