= Emperor Ōjin =

Legendary emperor of Japan

Emperor Ōjin 応神天皇
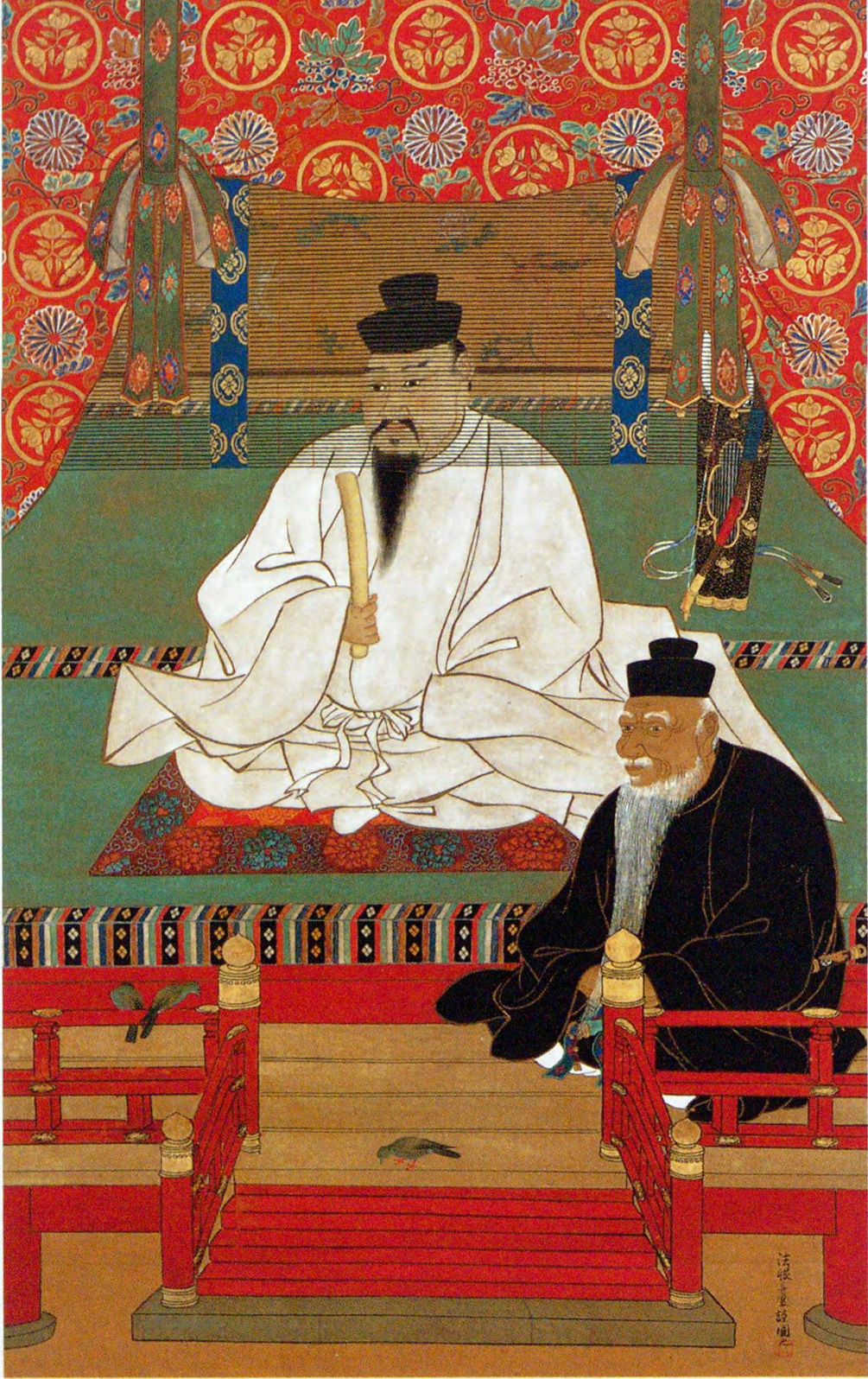
- Painting depicting Emperor Ōjin and his attendant Takenouchi no Sukune, Edo period.

Emperor of Japan
- Reign: 270–310 (traditional)
- Predecessor: Jingū (de facto) (Note: Jingū's reign as Empress is now confined to legends rather than fact. Modern historians have labeled her as an "Empress regent", who was the de facto ruler until Homutawake (Ōjin) became emperor.); Chūai (traditional)
- Successor: Nintoku
- Born: 201; Umi (Fukuoka)
- Died: 310 (aged 108–109); Karushima no Toyoakira (Nara)
- Burial: Eega no Mofushi no oka no misasagi (惠我藻伏崗陵) (Osaka)
- Spouse: Nakatsuhime-no-Mikoto
- Issue among others...: Emperor Nintoku
Posthumous name
- Chinese-style shigō: Emperor Ōjin (応神天皇) Japanese-style shigō: Homuta no Sumeramikoto (誉田天皇)
- House: Imperial House of Japan
- Father: Emperor Chūai
- Mother: Empress Jingū
- Religion: Shinto

Emperor Ōjin (応神天皇, Ōjin Tennō; Japanese pronunciation: [oː.(d)ʑiɴ, -(d)ʑin ten.noꜜː]), also known as Hondawake no Mikoto (誉田別尊; alternatively written 譽田別命, 誉田別命, 品陀和気命, 譽田分命, 誉田別尊, 品陀別命) or Homuta no Sumeramikoto (譽田天皇), was the 15th (possibly legendary) Emperor of Japan, according to the traditional order of succession. Both the Kojiki and the Nihon Shoki record events that took place during Ōjin's alleged lifetime. Ōjin is traditionally listed as the first emperor of the Kofun period, and is primarily known for being the controversial son of Empress Jingū. Historians have mixed views on his factual existence; if Ōjin was indeed a historical figure, then it is assumed he reigned much later than he is attested.

No firm dates can be assigned to Ōjin's life or reign, but he is traditionally considered to have reigned from 270 to 310. According to the Shinto religion and Buddhism in Japan, Emperor Ōjin is the divine spirit of the deity Hachiman (八幡神). While the location of Ōjin's grave (if any) is unknown, he is traditionally venerated at a memorial Shinto tomb. Modern historians have come to the conclusion that the title of "Emperor" and the name "Ōjin" was used by later generations to describe this possibly legendary Emperor.

== Legendary narrative ==
The Japanese have traditionally accepted this sovereign's historical existence, and a mausoleum (misasagi) for Ōjin is currently maintained. The following information available is taken from the pseudo-historical Kojiki and Nihon Shoki, which are collectively known as Kiki (記紀) or Japanese chronicles. These chronicles include legends and myths, as well as potential historical facts that have since been exaggerated and/or distorted over time. The circumstances surrounding the future emperor's birth are controversial as they involve a supposed invasion of the Korean Peninsula as well as a biologically impossible gestation period (3 years). It is said by the Kiki that Ōjin was conceived but unborn when his father Emperor Chūai died. Empress Jingū then became a de facto ruler who allegedly invaded a "promised land" (Korea) out of revenge, then returned three years later to the Japanese mainland to give birth. The records state that Ōjin was born to Empress Jingū in Tsukushi Province sometime in 201 AD, and was given the name Homutawake (誉田別尊). He became the crown prince at the age of four, but was not crowned Emperor until 270 AD at the age of 70. Emperor Ōjin supposedly lived in two palaces which are now located in present-day Osaka. His reign lasted 40 years until his death in 310 AD, in all he fathered 28 children with one spouse and ten consorts. His fourth son Ōosazaki was later enthroned as the next emperor in 313 AD.

== Known information ==
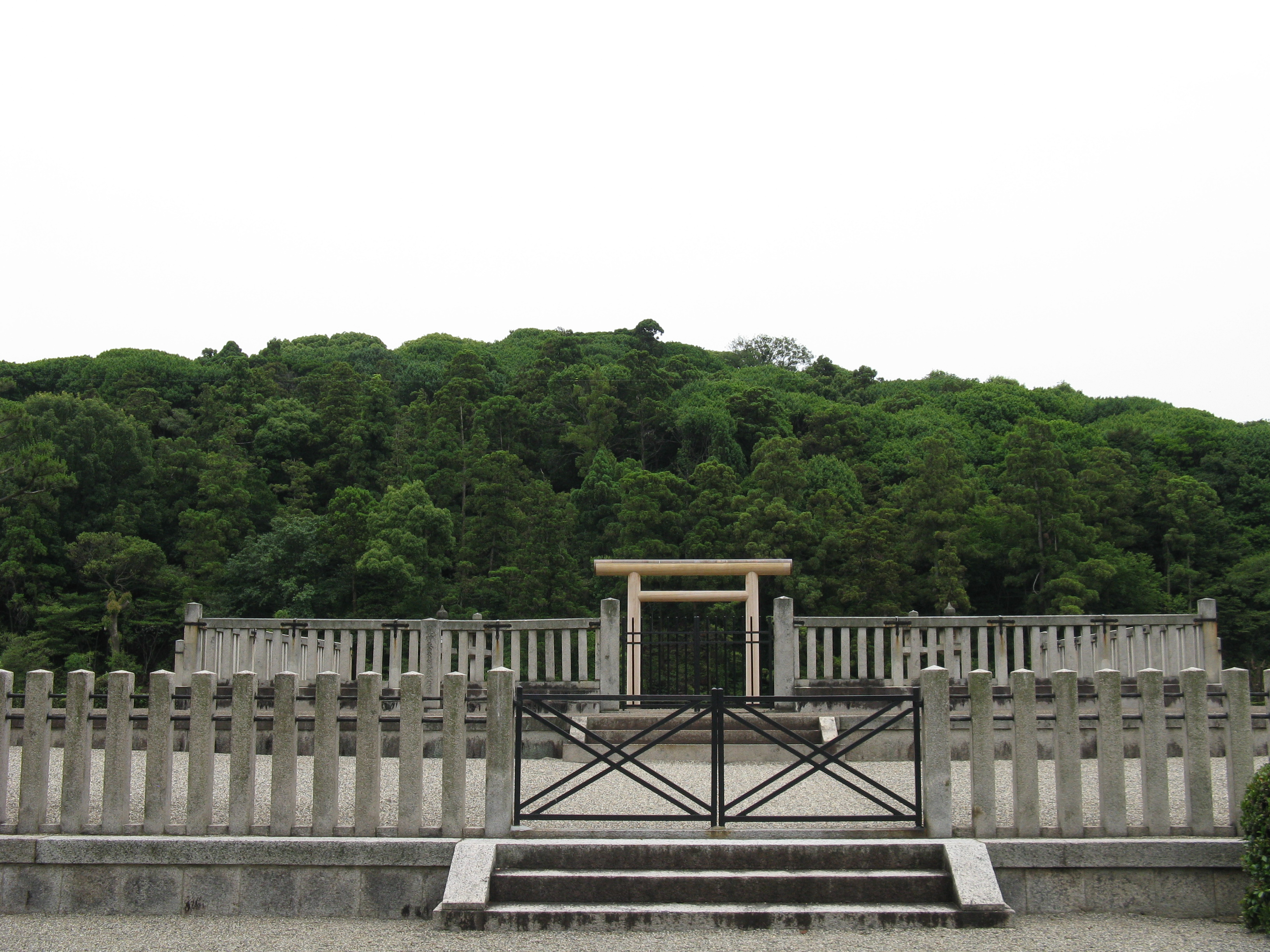
Memorial Shinto shrine and mausoleum honoring Emperor Ōjin.

While the historical existence of Emperor Ōjin is debated among historians, there is a general consensus that he was "probably real". There is also an agreement that Ojin's three year conception period is mythical and symbolic, rather than realistic. William George Aston has suggested that this can be interpreted as a period of less than nine months containing three "years" (some seasons), e.g. three harvests. If Ōjin was an actual historical figure then historians have proposed that he ruled later than attested. Dates of his actual reign have been proposed to be as early as 370 to 390 AD, to as late as the early 5th century AD. At least one Japanese historian has cast doubt on this theory though, by revising a supporting statement given in 1972. In this new narrative Louis Perez states: "only kings and emperors after the reign of Ojin... ...are seen as historical figures". In either case there is also no evidence to suggest that the title tennō was used during the time to which Ōjin's reign has been assigned. It is certainly possible that he was a chieftain or local clan leader, and that the polity he ruled would have only encompassed a small portion of modern-day Japan. The name Ōjin-tennō was more than likely assigned to him posthumously by later generations.

While the actual site of Ōjin's grave is not known, this regent is traditionally venerated at a kofun-type Imperial tomb in Osaka. The Imperial Household Agency designates this location as Ōjin's mausoleum, and is formally named Eega no Mofushi no oka no misasagi. At some point Ōjin was made a guardian Kami of the Hata clan, and is now also deified as Hachiman Daimyōjin. (Note: Ōjin's Hachiman name is translated to "Guardian of warriors") Outside of the Kiki, the reign of Emperor Kinmei (Note: The 29th Emperor) (c. 509 – 571 AD) is the first for which contemporary historiography has been able to assign verifiable dates. The conventionally accepted names and dates of the early Emperors were not confirmed as "traditional" though, until the reign of Emperor Kanmu (Note: Kanmu was the 50th sovereign of the imperial dynasty) between 737 and 806 AD.

== Family ==
Emperor Ōjin's family allegedly consisted of 28 children, which include 2 unnamed princesses from a previous marriage. He had one spouse who bore him a son that would become the next Emperor, as well as 10 consorts.

=== Spouse & concubines ===
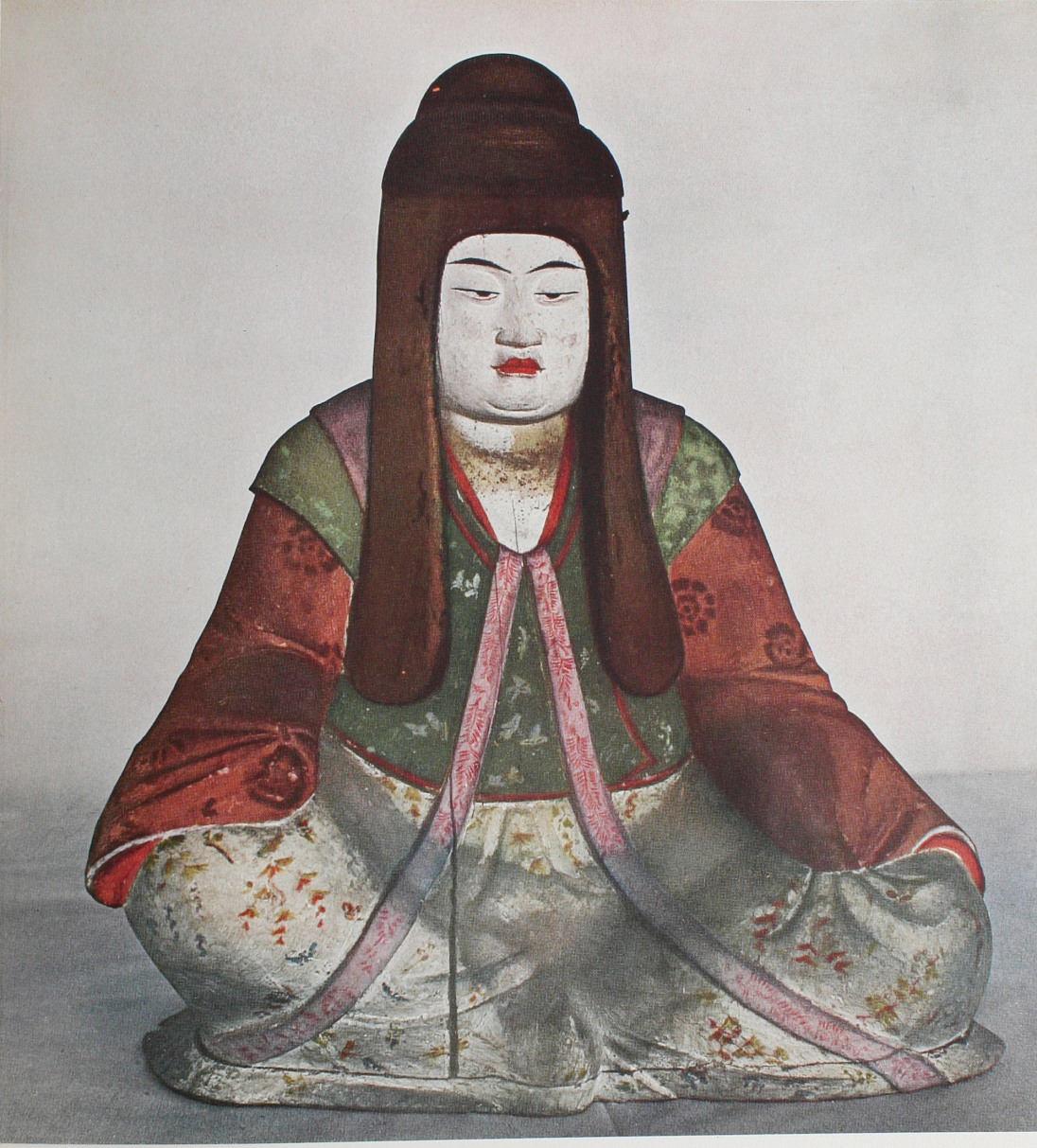
Nakatsuhime Kami Statue

Position	Name	Father	Issue
Kōgō	Nakatsu-hime (仲姫命)	Homudamawaka	• Princess Arata • Prince Netori • Prince Ōosazaki (Note: It is only known that "Ōosazaki" was the Fourth son of Emperor Ōjin. No mention is given about a numerical order of sons or daughters other than this historical footnote.) (later Emperor Nintoku)
Consort	Takaki no iri-hime (高城入姫命)	Homudamawaka	• Prince Izanomawaka • Princess Komukuta • Prince Nukata no Ōnakatsuhiko • Princess Ohara • Prince Ōyamamori
Consort	Oto-hime (弟姫命)	Homudamawaka	• Princess Ahe • Princess Awaji no Mihara • Princess Ki no Uno • Princess Mino no Iratsume • Princess Shigehara
Consort	Miyanushiyaka-hime (宮主宅媛)	Wani no Hifure no Omi	• Princess Metori • Prince Uji no Wakiiratsuko • Princess Yata
Consort	Onabe-hime (小甂媛)	Wani no Hifure no Omi	• Princess Uji no Wakiiratsu-hime
Consort	Okinaga Mawakanakatsu-hime (息長真若中比売)	Kawamata Nakatsuhiko	• Prince Wakanuke no Futamata
Consort	Ito-hime (糸媛)	Sakuraitabe no Muraji Shimatarine	• Prince Hayabusawake
Consort	Himuka no Izumi no Naga-hime (日向泉長媛)	Unknown	• Princess Hatabi no Wakairatsume • Prince Ōhae • Prince Ohae
Consort	Kaguro-hime (迦具漏比売)	Sumeiroōnakatsuhiko (Note: Additionally, there are 2 more unnamed princesses speculated to be Prince "Wakanuke no Futamata"s daughters.)	• Prince Kataji • Princess Kawarata no Iratsume • Princess Tama no Iratsume
Consort	Katsuragi no Irome (葛城野伊呂売)	Takenouchi no Sukune	• Prince Izanomawaka (Note: This is unconfirmed)
Consort	E-hime (兄媛)	Kibi-no-Takehiko	—N/a

=== Issue ===
Status	Name	Mother	Comments
Princess	Arata (荒田皇女)	Nakatsu-hime	Very little is known about this person.
Prince	Ōosazaki (大鷦鷯尊)	Nakatsu-hime	Would later become Emperor Nintoku.
Prince	Netori (根鳥皇子)	Nakatsu-hime	Ancestor of Ōta no Kimi (大田君), married Princess Awaji no Mihara (see below).
Prince	Izanomawaka (去来真稚皇子)	Takakiiri-hime	Ancestor of Fukakawawake (深河別).
Prince	Nukata no Ōnakatsuhiko (額田大中彦皇子)	Takakiiri-hime	Very little is known about this person.
Prince	Ōyamamori (大山守皇子)	Takakiiri-hime	Ōyamamori died in 310 AD. (Note: Ōyamamori is also known as being an ancestor of Hijikata no Kimi (土形君) and Haibara no Kimi (榛原君).)
Princess	Komukuta (澇来田皇女)	Takakiiri-hime	Very little is known about this person.
Princess	Ōhara (大原皇女)	Takakiiri-hime	Very little is known about this person.
Princess	Ahe (阿倍皇女)	Oto-hime	Very little is known about this person.
Princess	Awaji no Mihara (淡路御原皇女)	Oto-hime	Married to Prince Netori
Princess	Ki no Uno (紀之菟野皇女)	Oto-hime	Very little is known about this person.
Princess	Mino no Iratsume (三野郎女)	Oto-hime	Very little is known about this person.
Princess	Shigehara (滋原皇女)	Oto-hime	Very little is known about this person.
Prince	Uji no Wakiiratsuko (菟道稚郎子皇子)	Miyanushiyaka-hime	Uji was a Crown Prince.
Princess	Metori (雌鳥皇女)	Miyanushiyaka-hime	Metori died in 353 AD, and was married to Prince "Hayabusawake" (see below).
Princess	Yata (矢田皇女)	Miyanushiyaka-hime	Yata was later married to Emperor Nintoku.
Princess	Uji no Wakiiratsu-hime (菟道稚郎女皇女)	Onabe-hime	Uji was later married to Emperor Nintoku.
Prince	Wakanuke no Futamata (稚野毛二派皇子)	Okinaga Mawakanakatsu-hime	Ancestor of Okinaga clan (息長君), and great-grandfather of Emperor Keitai.
Prince	Hayabusawake (隼総別皇子)	Ito-hime	Hayabusawake was the husband of Princess Metori (雌鳥皇女).
Prince	Ōhae (大葉枝皇子)	Himuka no Izumi no Naga-hime	Very little is known about this person.
Prince	Ohae (小葉枝皇子)	Himuka no Izumi no Naga-hime	Very little is known about this person.
Princess	Kusakanohatabino-hime (草香幡梭皇女)	Himuka no Izumi no Naga-hime	Hatabi was later married to Emperor Richū
Princess	Kawarata no Iratsume (川原田郎女)	Kaguro-hime	Very little is known about this person.
Princess	Tama no Iratsume (玉郎女)	Kaguro-hime	Very little is known about this person.
Prince	Kataji (迦多遅王)	Kaguro-hime	Very little is known about this person.
Prince	Izanomawaka (伊奢能麻和迦王 – 去来真稚皇子)	Katsuragi no Irome	Very little is known about this person.

== See also ==
- Emperor of Japan
- Hachiman
- Imperial cult
- List of Emperors of Japan

== Notes ==
Japanese Imperial kamon — a stylized chrysanthemum blossom

Regnal titles
Preceded by Emperor Chūai	Emperor of Japan: Ōjin; 270–310 (traditional dates)	Succeeded by Emperor Nintoku
