= Book of Song =

Historical text of the Liu Song dynasty

- Traditional Chinese: 宋書
- Simplified Chinese: 宋书
Transcriptions
Standard Mandarin
- Hanyu Pinyin: Sòng Shū
Southern Min
- Hokkien POJ: Sòng-su

The Book of Song (Chinese: 宋書; pinyin: Sòng Shū), is one of the Twenty-Four Histories and covers the history of the Liu Song dynasty of the Southern Dynasties of China. It covers history from 420 to 479, and is one of the Twenty-Four Histories, a traditional collection of historical records. It was written in 492–493 by Shen Yue from the Southern Qi dynasty (479–502).

The work contained 100 volumes at the time that it was written, but some volumes were already missing by the time of the Song dynasty. Later editors reconstructed those volumes by taking material from the History of the Southern Dynasties, plus a few works such as the Historiette of Gao by Gao Jun, though many of those volumes were no longer in their original condition.

== History ==
The Book of Song was based on records compiled beginning in the Liu Song. He Chentian (何承天; c.370 – c.447) (Note: He himself has a biography in Book of Song, which recorded that he died at the age of 78 (by East Asian reckoning) around the 24th year of the Yuanjia era of the reign of Emperor Wen of Song.) was commissioned by the imperial court of the time in 439. He compiled biographies and also treatises on astronomy and music. Compilation was later continued by Shan Qianzhi (山謙之; fl. 440–456), and Xu Yuan (徐爰; 394–475). (Note: Xu himself has a biography in Book of Song, which recorded that he died at the age of 82 (by East Asian reckoning) in the 3rd year of the Yuanhui era of Liu Derong's reign.) The Southern Qi court commissioned Shen Yue in 487 to complete the Book of Song.

Historian Pei Ziye later summarized the work into a more succinct version, Summary of Song (《宋略》); after reading Summary of Song, Shen Yue was recorded to have said, "This is a standard which I cannot reach."

== Contents ==
The first ten juan or volume are annals of the Liu Song emperors, 30 juan contain treatises, and 60 juan are dedicated to biographies.

== Translations ==
There are no known full translations to English. Dien includes partial translations of The Disputation at Pengcheng, a conflict in present-day Xuzhou. Dien compares the Northern Wei and Liu Song accounts of this one in a long series of conflicts between the two states. The Liu Song account is included in volume 59 of the Book of Song. Holcombe translates a fragment of volume 54 on a land petition.
