= Tokushi Yoron =

The Tokushi Yoron (読史余論, A Reading of History) is an Edo period historical analysis of Japanese history written in 1712 by Arai Hakuseki (1657–1725).

== Differences from previous chronologies ==
Hakuseki's innovative effort to understand and explain the history of Japan differs significantly from previous chronologies which were created by other writers, such as

- Gukanshō (circa 1220) by Jien, whose work evidenced a distinctly Buddhist perspective; or
- Jinnō Shōtōki (1359) by Kitabatake Chikafusa, whose work evidenced a distinctly Shinto perspective; or
- Nihon Ōdai Ichiran (1652) by Hayashi Gahō, whose work evidenced a distinctly neo-Confucian perspective.

Hakuseki's work avoids such easy categorization, and yet, he would have resisted being labeled non-Shinto, non-Buddhist, or non-Confucianist in his life or work. His analytical approach to history differed from his predecessors in that the Tokushi Yoron identifies a process of transferring power across generations. Earlier Japanese histories were intended, in large part, to be construed as documenting how the past legitimizes the present status quo.

== Plagiarism from previous works ==
Tokushi Yoron is not without its problems. Hakuseki has been criticized for being overly casual in identifying the sources he used in writing. For example, he borrowed extensively from Hayashi Gahō's Nihon Ōdai Ichiran; but he felt no need to acknowledge this fact. Nevertheless, the organizing schema of Tokushi Yoron presented the periodization of history on the basis of changes in political power; and this rational stance sets this work apart from its sources.

== See also ==
- Historiographical Institute of the University of Tokyo
- International Research Center for Japanese Studies
- Japanese Historical Text Initiative
- Historiography of Japan
