= Makoto =

- Gender: Male/Female
- Language: Japanese

Origin
- Meaning: sincerity
- Depending on the kanji used to write the name 'Makoto', it can have different meanings. Alternately, 'Makoto' as a name can be written simply in katakana or hiragana.

Makoto (まこと, マコト) is a unisex Japanese name, although it is more commonly used by males.

As a noun, Makoto means "sincerity" (誠) or "truth" (真, 眞).

== People ==
=== Given name ===
- Makoto (musician) (born 1977), drum and bass artist
- Makoto (Sharan Q) (まこと), drummer of Sharan Q
- Makoto (streamer) (まこと), Japanese streamer, voice actress
- Makoto (wrestler) (born 1989), professional wrestler
- Makoto Akaho (赤穂 真; born 1971), Japanese basketball player
- Makoto Chūza (中座 真; born 1970), Japanese shogi player
- Makoto Fujita (藤田 まこと; 1933–2010), Japanese actor
- Makoto Fujita (chemist) (藤田 誠; born 1957), Japanese chemist
- Makoto Fukami (深見 真; born 1977), Japanese writer
- Makoto Furukawa (古川 慎; born 1989), Japanese voice actor
- Makoto Furukawa (writer) (古川 真人; born 1988), Japanese writer
- Makoto Gonokami (五神 真; born 1957), Japanese academic
- Makoto Hagiwara (萩原 眞; 1854–1925), landscape designer often credited with inventing the fortune cookie
- Makoto Hasebe (長谷部 誠; born 1984), Japanese footballer
- Makoto Hiejima (比江島 慎; born 1990), Japanese basketball player
- Makoto Hirose (広瀬 誠; born 1976), Japanese Paralympic judoka
- Makoto Horikawa (堀川 亮), birth name of Ryō Horikawa (堀川 りょう; born 1958), Japanese actor and voice actor
- Makoto Imaoka (今岡 誠; born 1974), professional baseball player
- Makoto Inoue (井上 信; born 1974), professional golfer
- Makoto Ito (born 2004), Japanese ice hockey player
- Makoto Itoh (伊藤 誠; 1936–2023), Japanese economist
- Mako (actor) (岩松 誠, 1933–2006), Japanese-American actor and voice actor frequently credited as Mako
- Makoto Kamada (鎌田 誠; born 1950), Japanese sport wrestler
- Makoto Kawabata (河端 一), Japanese musician
- Makoto Kawahira (川平 誠; born 1971), Japanese ice hockey player
- Makoto Kawamoto (川本 真琴; born 1974), Japanese pop singer, songwriter and multi-instrumentalist
- Makoto Kikuchi (1925–2012), Japanese physicist
- Makoto Kikuchi (菊地 信; 1911–unknown), Japanese field hockey player
- Makoto Kimura (木村 誠; born 1979), Japanese footballer
- Makoto Kobayashi (disambiguation), multiple people
- Makoto Koichi (小市 眞琴), Japanese voice actress
- Makoto Kōsaka (高坂 真琴; born 1950), Japanese voice actress
- Makoto Koshinaka (越中睦 / 越中睦士; born 1980), Japanese musician, actor and model
- Makoto Minamiyama (南山 真; born 1973), Japanese basketball player
- Makoto Moroi (諸井 誠; 1930–2013), Japanese composer, son of Saburō Moroi
- Makoto Muramatsu (村松 誠; born 1947), artist famous for pictures of cats and dogs
- Makoto Nagano (長野 誠; born 1972), 2006 SASUKE winner
- Makoto Nakajima (中嶋 誠; born 1952), former commissioner of the Japan Patent Office
- Makoto Nakamura (中村 誠; born 1970), Japanese anime screenwriter
- Makoto Nishimoto (西本 誠; born 1986), Japanese politician
- Makoto Niwano (にわの まこと; born 1964), manga artist
- Makoto Ogawa (小川 麻琴; born 1987), former member of the idol group Morning Musume
- Makoto Oishi (大石 真翔; born 1979), professional wrestler
- Makoto Okazaki (岡崎 慎, born 1998), Japanese football player
- Makoto Okunaka (奥仲 麻琴; born 1993), J-pop idol and member of idol group Passpo
- Makoto Ojiro (オジロ マコト), manga artist
- Makoto Ōoka (大岡 信; 1931–2017), Japanese poet and literary critic
- Makoto Ozone (小曽根 真; born 1961), Japanese jazz pianist
- Makoto Raiku (雷句 誠; born 1974), Japanese manga artist
- Makoto Rindo (林堂 眞; born 1989), Japanese footballer
- Makoto Saitō (斎藤 実; 1858–1936), Japanese naval officer and politician
- Makoto Sakamoto (マコト・サカモト), drummer
- Makoto Sakamoto (born 1947), retired Japanese-born American artistic gymnast and coach
- Makoto Sasaki (disambiguation), multiple people
- Makoto Satō (disambiguation), multiple people
- Makoto Shinkai (新海 誠; born 1973), anime director
- Makoto Shiraishi (白石 洵; born 1940), Japanese sport shooter
- Makoto Sumikawa (澄川 真琴; born 1964), Japanese actress and voice actress
- Makoto Takahashi, drummer of Boøwy
- Makoto Takasaka (高坂 真琴; born 1998), Japanese child actress cast in Japanese television series Fugo Keiji
- Makoto Tamada (玉田 誠; born 1976), former Japanese professional motorcycle racer
- Makoto Tamamura (玉村 誠), Japanese engineer
- Makoto Taniguchi (谷口 誠; 1930–2024), Japanese diplomat and academic
- Makoto Tezuka (手塚 眞; born 1961), Japanese film and anime director, son of Osamu Tezuka
- Makoto Tobe (戸辺 誠; born 1986), Japanese shogi player
- Makoto Tomioka (1897–1926), terrorist
- Makoto Tsumura (津村 まこと; born 1965), Japanese voice actress
- Makoto Ueda (disambiguation)
- Makoto Yamaguchi (山口 真; born 1944), origami artist
- Makoto Yamashita (山下真; born 1968), current governor of Nara Prefecture
- Makoto Yamazaki (山崎 真; born 1970), Japanese footballer and manager
- Makoto Yonekura (米倉 誠; born 1970), Japanese footballer
- Makoto Yukimura (幸村 誠; born 1976), Japanese manga artist

=== Family name ===
- Naoya Makoto (born 1948), Japanese actor
- Shiela Makoto (born 1990), Zimbabwean association football defender

== Characters ==
- Makoto (マコト) (Mako), a character in the anime Digimon Tamers
- Makoto (マコト), in Enchanted Arms
- Makoto/Proto-Makoto, a character in the MySims series
- Makoto (まこと), in the Street Fighter series
- Makoto, in Tales of the Otori
- Makoto Aihara (藍原 誠), in Rumble Roses and Rumble Roses XX
- Makoto Aikawa (愛川 誠), in Machine Robo Rescue
- Makoto Amano (天野 真琴), in W Juliet
- Makoto "Mako-chan" Ariga (有賀 誠), in Wandering Son.
- Makoto Date (伊達 真), in Yakuza Kiwami
- Makoto Edamura (枝村 真人), a character in the anime series Great Pretender.
- Makoto Ese (絵瀬 まこと) (Vera Misham), a character in the video game Apollo Justice: Ace Attorney
- Makoto Fukami (深海 マコト), in Kamen Rider Ghost
- Makoto Hanamiya (花宮 真), in Kuroko's Basketball
- Makoto Hashimoto (橋本 真恋人), in Battle Royale II: Blitz Royale
- Makoto Hozumi (穂積 真琴), in Sasami: Magical Girls Club
- Makoto Hyuga (日向 マコト), in Neon Genesis Evangelion
- Makoto Isshiki (一色 真), in RahXephon
- Makoto Itō (伊藤 誠), in School Days
- Makoto Jin (神 誠), in Battle Fever J
- Makoto Kashino (樫野 真), in Yumeiro Patissiere
- Makoto Kenzaki (剣崎 真琴) in DokiDoki! PreCure
- Makoto Kibune (貴船 理), in Bleach (manga)
- Makoto Kikuchi (菊地 真), in The Idolmaster
- Makoto Kino (木野 まこと) (Lita Kino), in Sailor Moon
- Makoto Konno (紺野 真琴), in The Girl Who Leapt Through Time
- Makoto Kousaka (高坂 真琴), in Genshiken
- Makoto Kozuka (狐塚 誠), in Paranoia Agent
- Makoto Kyogoku (京極 真), in Detective Conan
- Makoto Majima (真島 誠), in Ikebukuro West Gate Park
- Makoto Makimura (マキムラ マコト), in Yakuza 0 and Yakuza Kiwami 2
- Makoto Misumi (深澄 真), in Tsukimichi: Moonlit Fantasy
- Makoto Mizoguchi (溝口 誠), in Fighter's History
- Makoto Mizuhara (水原 誠), in El-Hazard
- Makoto Morishita (森下 マコト), in Wangan Midnight
- Makoto Munechika (宗近 真) in Kattobi Itto
- Makoto Naegi (苗木 誠), a major character in the Danganronpa series
- Makoto Nakashima (中島 真), a character in Haikyū!!
- Makoto Nanaya (マコト＝ナナヤ) in the BlazBlue series
- Makoto Narita (成田 真), in W Juliet
- Makoto Nijigahara (虹ヶ原 マコト), in Aikatsu!
- Makoto Niijima (新島 真), in Persona 5
- Makoto Ōgami (大神 信), in Ghost Hound
- Makoto Onoda (小野田 真), in Futari Ecchi
- Makoto "Baal" Raiden (雷電 眞), a side character in Genshin Impact
- Makoto Sako (迫 真琴), in Shin Megami Tensei: Devil Survivor 2
- Makoto Sakurai (桜井 誠), a character from the anime and manga series Nichijou
- Makoto Saotome (早乙女 マコト), a character in Kannazuki no Miko.
- Makoto Sawatari (沢渡 真琴), in Kanon
- Makoto Shido (獅堂 まこと), in Idaten Jump
- Makoto Shishio (志々雄 真実), a villain in Rurouni Kenshin
- Makoto Sugihara (杉原 誠) in Crows
- Makoto Tachibana (橘 真琴), in Free! - Iwatobi Swim Club
- Makoto Takei (竹井 誠), in Fruits Basket
- Makoto Teruhashi (照橋 信), a character in The Disastrous Life of Saiki K..
- Makoto Yanagi (八凪 真人), in Ayaka: A Story of Bonds and Wounds
- Makoto Yokomizo (横溝 真琴) in AKB0048
- Makoto Yuki (結城 理), in Persona 3
- Makoto Yutaka (豊 麻琴), a character in the manga The Day of Revolution and Princess Princess
- Makoto Yuuki (優木 誠人) (Jacques Portsman), a character in the video game Ace Attorney Investigations: Miles Edgeworth
- Makoto Yuuki (遊木 真), a character in Ensemble Stars!

== See also ==
- Motoko, a given name
