= Japanese Historical Text Initiative =

Online database of Japanese historical documents

Japanese Historical Text Initiative (JHTI) is a searchable online database of Japanese historical documents and English translations. It is part of the Center for Japanese Studies at the University of California at Berkeley.

== History ==
Delmer M. Brown started the process of establishing JHTI in 1998. The development of JHTI involved negotiations with the University of Tokyo Press and the National Institute of Japanese Literature.

== Select list ==
JHTI is an expanding online collection of historical texts. The original version of every paragraph is cross-linked with an English translation. The original words in Japanese and English translation are on the same screen. There are seven categories of writings, including

=== Ancient chronicles ===
These works were compiled by officials of the Imperial Court at the command of the emperors.

- Kojiki (completed in 712 CE) with translation by Donald L. Philippi
- Nihon Shoki (completed in 720) with translation by W. G. Aston
- Shoku Nihongi (covering 697 to 791) with translation by J. B. Snellen
- Kogo Shūi (completed in 807) with translation by Genchi Katō and Hikoshirō Hoshino

=== Ancient gazetteers ===
These records, Fudoki, were compiled by provincial officials according to imperial edicts during the first half of the 8th century.

- Izumo no Kuni Fudoki (出雲国風土記) (submitted in 733) with translation by Michiko Aoki
- Harima no Kuni Fudoki (播磨国風土記) with translation by Michiko Aoki
- Bungo no Kuni Fudoki (豊後国風土記) with translation by Michiko Aoki
- Hizen no Kuni Fudoki (肥前国風土記) with translation by Michiko Aoki
- Hitachi no Kuni Fudoki (常陸国風土記) with translation by Michiko Aoki

=== Ancient kami-civil code ===
This was a compilation of religious law and civil law.

- Engishiki (927) with translation by Felicia Gressitt Bock

=== Medieval stories ===
These historical tales (monogatari) were about what was said and done by the prominent historical figures in aristocratic and military clans in feudal Japan

- Okagami (covering the years 866 to 1027) with translation by Helen Craig McCullough
- Yamato Monogatari (completed around 951) with translation by Mildred Tahara translation
- Eiga Monogatari (covering the years 794 to 1185) with translation by William H. McCullough & Helen Craig McCullough
- Taiheiki (completed around 1371) with translation by Helen Craig McCullough
- Azuma Kagami (completed around 1300) with partial translation by Minoru Shinoda

=== Medieval and early-modern histories ===
These three histories were written in ways that mirror the religious and political interests of their authors.

- Gukanshō (completed in 1219) with translation by Delmer M. Brown and Ichiro Ishida
- Jinnō Shōtōki (completed in 1339) with translation by H. Paul Varley
- Tokushi Yoron (completed in 1712) with translation by Joyce Ackroyd

=== State and Imperial Shinto ===
These works are about State Shinto and the Empire of Japan.

- Meiji Ikô Jinja Kankei Hôrei Shiryô (明治以降神社関係法令史料; Governmental Orders Concerning Shinto Shrines After the First Year of Meiji)
- Kokutai no Hongi (Cardinal Principles of Nation Polity, 1937) with translation by John Owen Gauntlett

=== Late-Edo period and Meiji period texts ===
This category is for miscellaneous writings which are from Japan's pre-modern and early-modern periods.

== See also ==
- Aozora Bunko
- JSTOR
