= Princess Iitoyo =

Possible empress regnant of Japan between 484 and 485

Princess Iitoyo 飯豊青皇女
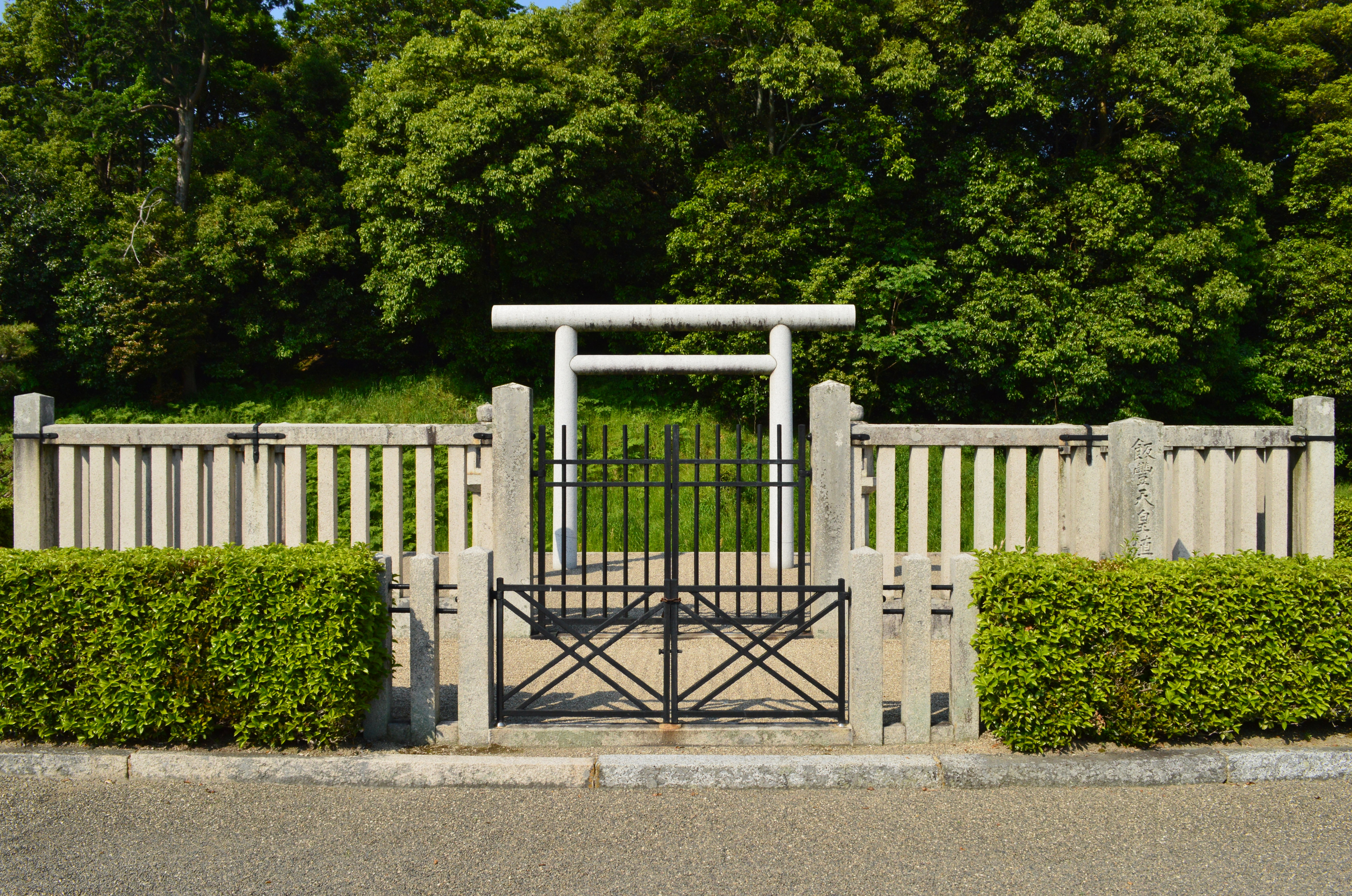
- Kitahanachi Otsuka Kofun where she is believed to be buried.

Empress of Japan (possibly)
- Reign: 484–485 (de facto)
- Predecessor: Emperor Seinei (traditional)
- Successor: Emperor Kenzō (traditional)
- Born: Iitoyo-hime; 440 (Note: Most scholars agree with the Nihon Shoki, where Princess Iitoyo is described as being the aunt of Princes Woke and Oke.)
- Died: 485
- Burial: Kitahanachi Otsuka Kofun
Posthumous name
- Chinese-style shigō: Princess Iitoyo (Iitoyo-hime) (飯豊青皇女) Chinese-style shigō: Empress Iitoyo (Iitoyo-tennō) (飯豊天皇) Japanese-style shigō: Oshinumi-no-iitoyo-no-ao
- House: Imperial House of Japan
- Father: Emperor Richū or Ichinobe no Oshiwa
- Mother: Kuro-hime (黒媛) or Hae-hime (荑媛)

Iitoyo (飯豊青皇女, 440–485) was a Japanese imperial princess and allegedly empress regnant for a short period between Emperor Seinei and Emperor Kenzō. (Note: She was most likely an empress regnant (at least in the traditional narrative) but has also been referred to as a "Placeholder Empress".)

== Given names ==
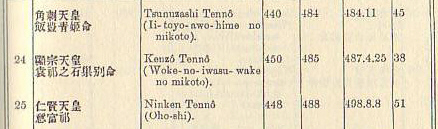
Iitoyo's entry as Empress Tsunuzashi in the Tennō list (list of emperors) by Ernest Mason Satow, Japanese Chronological Tables, 1874

Princess Iitoyo (飯豊青皇女) is also referred to as Queen Iitoyo (飯豊青尊), Oshinumi (青海郎女 or 忍海郎女), and Princess Aomi (飯豊郎女). Her primary name Iitoyo is an old Japanese word for an owl ("いひとよ"), "Oshinumi" is the name of a place in Katsuragi, while the origin of Aomi remains unknown. It's also noted that Iitoyo has also been given the posthumous names: Seitei–tenno and Tsunuzashi-tenno. This latter title was more than likely assigned to her by later generations as there is no evidence to suggest that the title tennō (meaning "emperor") was used during the 5th century for Japanese monarchs.

== Traditional narrative ==
The Japanese have traditionally accepted this royal's historical existence, and a mausoleum (misasagi) for Iitoyo is currently maintained. The following information available is taken from the pseudo-historical Kojiki and Nihon Shoki, which are collectively known as Kiki (記紀) or Japanese chronicles. These chronicles include legends and myths, as well as potential historical facts that have since been exaggerated and/or distorted over time. Princess Iitoyo was born sometime in 440 AD and is also referred to as "Aomi no Himemiko" (青海皇女). While both chronicles agree that Iitoyo descended from Emperor Richū, the exact degree of this relationship is told differently. According to the Kojiki, Iitoyo was born to Kuro-hime (黒媛) and was the younger sister of the imperial prince Ichinobe no Oshiwa. This would make her a daughter of Emperor Richū and aunt of the princes Woke and Oke. Alternatively, the Nihon Shoki states that Iitoyo was the daughter of Ichinobe no Oshiwa and his wife Hae-hime (荑媛), which would make her a sister of Woke and Oke and a grandchild of Emperor Richū.

Both of the chronicles (Kiki) are in agreement that after the death of the 20th Emperor Ankō (r. 453–456 (Note: These dates are traditional.)), his brother murdered all rivals who could claim the throne and then ruled as the 21st Emperor Yūryaku (r. 456 – 479). Notably, his victims included his cousin Prince Ichinobe no Oshiwa, who was the eldest son and crown prince of Emperor Richū. Oshiwa's sons Woke and Ōke fled to the countryside after his murder and sought refuge under the care of a muraji. Many years passed before Iitoyo's name first appeared in the chronicles in the history of the 22nd Emperor Seinei (r. 479–484) (Yūryaku's son and successor). Because Seinei had no children and otherwise no close relatives, another suitable heir to the throne from the lineage of the Sun Goddess Amaterasu had to be sought.

The chronicles once again fork the narrative regarding when Woke and Ōke were found. According to the Kojiki, this search ended after Emperor Seinei's death with the discovery of Princess Iitoyo at the Tsunosashi Shrine in Katsuragi. She then appears to have taken over as regent until the governor of Harima province sent a message to the capital that he had found Princes Woke and Ōke. Iitoyo then gave the order to bring her nephews to her in the palace, where after some debate Ōke ceded the throne to Woke, who became Emperor Kenzō.

Alternatively, the Nihon Shoki states that two grandsons of Emperor Richū were eventually found and adopted by Emperor Seinei. Sometime in 482 AD, Prince Oke was appointed as Crown Prince while Woke was made a Royal Prince. Seinei's death sometime in 484 AD (possibly January) came with a problem as his two adopted sons were described by the Kojiki to be very courteous towards each other. Although Prince Oke had been appointed heir, he ceded the throne to his brother Prince Woke, who in turn ceded it back. The two debated the issue for about a year while Princess Iitoyo was allegedly made regent. Princess Iitoyo's death in 485 AD and burial place is only recorded in the Nihon Shoki. In this continuing narrative Prince Ōke ceded the "Empire" to Prince Woke who finally accepted the throne as Emperor Kenzō. Iitoyo was allegedly buried in a (misasagi) on Mount Haniguchi in Katsuraki.

== Historical assessment ==
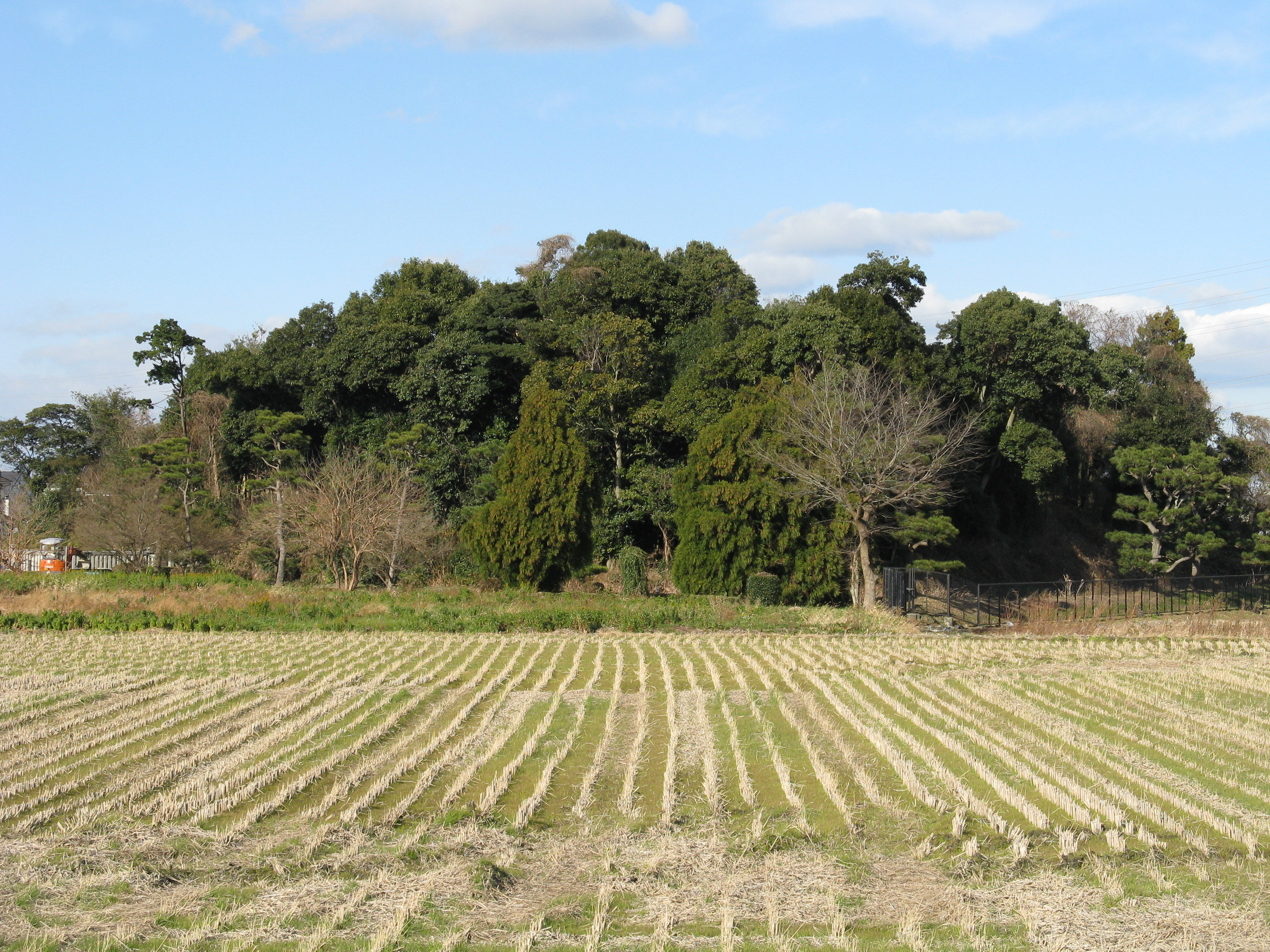
Tomb of Iitoyo.

Iitoyo is regarded by historians as a regent of some sort during the early 5th century whose existence is generally accepted as fact. However, it remains unknown if she was viewed historically as a regent or as a monarch in her own right. After Empress Jingū, Princess Iitoyo is the second woman described in the chronicles as having governed the country for a certain period of time. Like Jingū, she does not appear in the official list of emperors of Japan.

Aside from the Kiki, Iitoyo is also referred to as "Empress [Regnant]" (飯豊天皇 Iitoyo-tennō) in the Fusō Ryakuki and the Honchō Kōin Jōun-roku, a 12th-century and a 15th-century collection of historical texts, respectively. She is also mentioned by the Buddhist monk Jien, who supports the idea of Iitoyo being a reigning empress in the 1219 Japanese historical work Gukanshō; "She was called Empress Iitoyo and it is said that her reign was in the kinoe-ne year of the 60-year cycle."

Modern scholars continue to debate Iitoyo's exact role with different theories coming forward. Professor Delmer Brown noted that "her reign is not found in the ordinary Imperial chronologies." He also questioned the need for a regency as the state was "very well governed" during the reigns of Prince Ōke and Woke. Ethnologist Shinobu Orikuchi regards Iitoyo as the "first historical reigning Empress of Japan" who combines the roles of sovereign and shaman. Kusudo Yoshiaki points out that the Nihon Shoki refers to her death as bō, which is reserved exclusively for emperors. Professor Ben-Ami Shillony mentions that "[Iitoyo] was not accorded the status of a reigning empress by historians". However, he also acknowledged the viewpoints of Orikuchi and Yoshiaki.

== See also ==
- List of emperors of Japan
- Imperial cult
- Mount Iide

== Bibliography ==
- Louis-Frédéric (translated by Käthe Roth): Japan Encyclopedia, Harvard University Press 2005.
- Ernest Mason Satow: Japanese Chronological Tables (et al.), Reprinted by Yedo 1874, Bristol: Ganesha 1998.
- Ben-Ami Shillony: Enigma of the Emperors: Sacred subservience in Japanese History, Global Oriental 2005.
- Joan R. Piggott: Chieftain Pairs and Corulers: Female Sovereignty in Early Japan, in: Hitomi Tonomura, Anne Walthall, Wakita Haruko (ed.): Woman and Class in Japanese History, Michigan Monograph Series in Japahese Studies, No. 25, Ann Arbor: Center for Japanese Studies, University Michigan

Regnal titles
Preceded by Emperor Seinei	Empress of Japan (possibly); 484–485	Succeeded by Emperor Kenzō
