= Kitahanachi Otsuka Kofun =

Kofun burial mound in Japan

- 北花内大塚古墳 (Japanese)
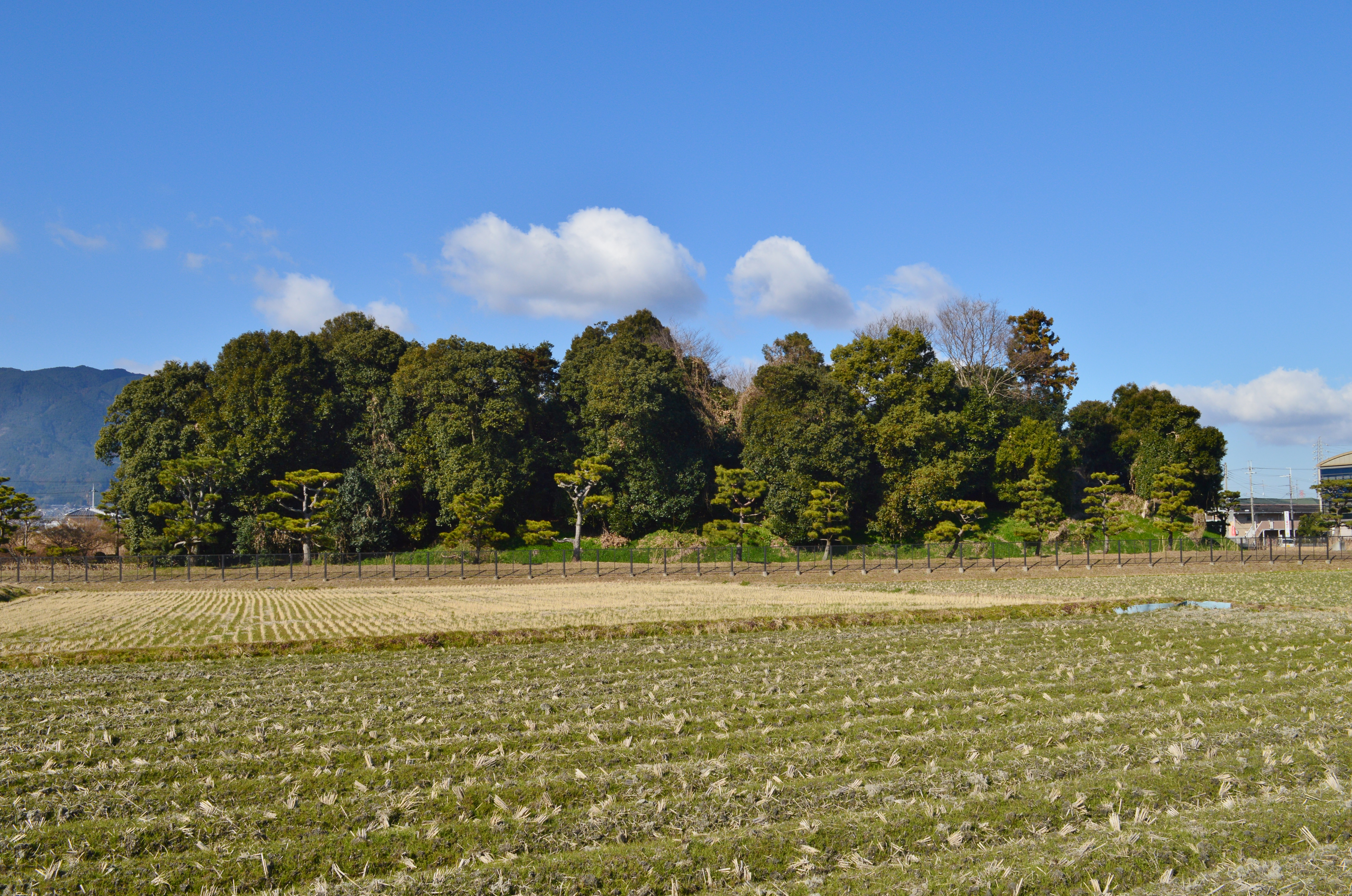
- Kitahanachi Otsuka Kofun (full horizontal view)

- Kitahanachi Otsuka Kofun Kitahanachi Otsuka Kofun (Japan)
- 34°29′3.54″N 135°43′36.55″E
- Type: Kofun
- Periods: Kofun period (late)
- Location: Katsuragi, Nara, Japan
- Region: Kansai region

History
- Built: 5th century AD

Site notes
- Management: Imperial Household Agency

Kitahanachi Otsuka Kofun (北花内大塚古墳) is an ancient circular mound tomb located in Katsuragi, Nara. While the actual person buried is unclear, the site is designated by the Imperial Household Agency as the tomb of Princess Iitoyo.

== Description ==
In the western part of Nara Prefecture at the foot of Mt. Katsuragi is an ancient tomb built on the plain. The tomb is managed by the Imperial Household Agency, who has conducted various investigations over the years. Kitahanachi Otsuka Kofun is described as a circular mound with a large front end facing southwest. While the construction method remains unknown, Tsukudeshi (Note: This refers to a semicircular or square platform-like facility that attaches directly to the burial mound) has been suggested. Items on the mounds surface include cylindrical and figurative haniwa as well as wood figures made of Japanese umbrella-pine. By dimensions the tomb measures 90 metres (300 ft) in length, and 70 metres (230 ft) in width with a rear circle diameter of 50 metres (160 ft). The tomb is also surrounded by a moat with a width of 10 to 15 meters (33 to 49 ft).

== History ==
The Kitahanachi Otsuka Kofun is estimated to have been built around the beginning of the late Kofun period. In the ancient Katsuragi region, the genealogy of the tombs starting with the Muro Miyayama Kofun (Gose) shows the aspect of moving from Katsuragi to the ancient Shiki area. It's noted that the Kitahanachi Otsuka Kofun is listed as a successor tomb of the Yashikiyama Kofun (c. 5th century). Events since the tomb's completion include the Yamato Shinjo Domain (大和新庄藩), as in 1680 Daimyo Kazuta Kuwayama (桑山 一尹) moved his clan to the mound. The Kofun was also greatly modified later in 1864 during the Bakumatsu when the mausoleum was repaired.

Three surveys have been conducted of the tomb in the modern era. The first two occurred in 1975, and between 1979 and 1981 which focused on the outer embankment. In 2006, a third and most recent preliminary survey was conducted due to maintenance work on the kofun.

== Owner ==
While the actual person buried in the kofun is unclear, the site is designated by the Imperial Household Agency as the tomb of Princess Iitoyo. Her place of burial "in the misasagi on the Hill of Haniguchi in Katsuraki" is only mentioned in the Nihon Shoki. Its also later described as the "Haniguchi Tomb" by the Engishiki. Princess Iitoyo's place of death has traditionally been in Katsuragi as she was discovered residing at the Tsunosashi Shrine in the events after Emperor Seinei's death.
