= Emperor Kenzō =

Emperor of Japan from 485 to 487

Emperor Kenzō 顕宗天皇
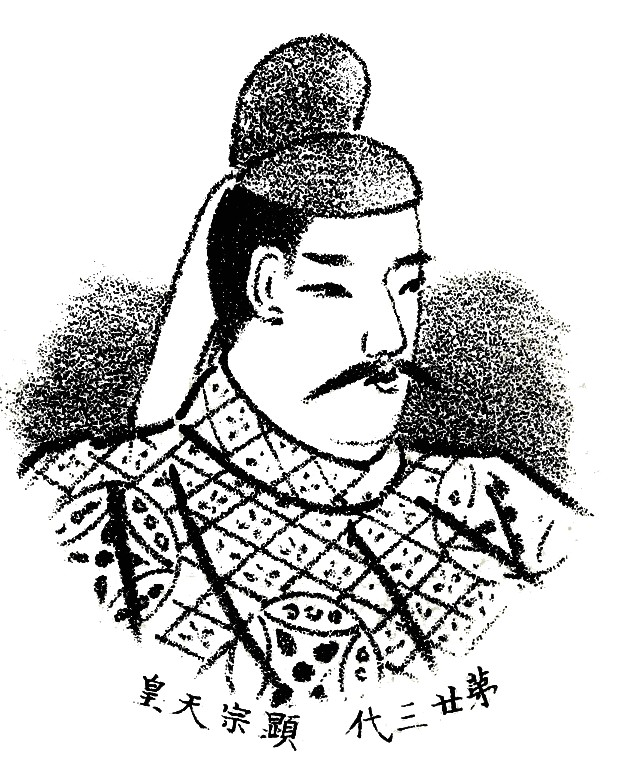

Emperor of Japan
- Reign: 485–487 (traditional)
- Predecessor: Princess Iitoyo (de facto); Seinei (traditional)
- Successor: Ninken
- Born: 449–450 (Note: Joseph Henry Longford mentions 449 AD as a birth year, while two other sources specifically state "450". Emperor Kenzō dying at the age of 38 would imply the former of these two possible years.)
- Died: 487 (aged 38) (Note: At least one source by Delmer M. Brown mentions Emperor Kenzō dying at the age of 48.); Asuka, Yamato
- Burial: Kataoka no Iwatsuki no oka no minami no misasagi (傍丘磐坏丘南陵) (Nara)
- Spouse: Naniwa-no-Ono
Posthumous name
- Chinese-style shigō: Emperor Kenzō (顕宗天皇) Japanese-style shigō: Woke no Sumeramikoto (弘計天皇)
- House: Imperial House of Japan
- Father: Ichinobe no Oshiwa
- Mother: Hae-hime

Emperor Kenzō (顕宗天皇, Kenzō-tennō) (449/50–487) was the 23rd emperor of Japan, according to the traditional order of succession. No firm dates can be assigned to this emperor's life or reign, but he is conventionally considered to have reigned from 485 to 487.

== Protohistoric narrative ==
=== Exile and Return ===
The Japanese have traditionally accepted this sovereign's historical existence, and a mausoleum (misasagi) for Kenzō is currently maintained. The following information available is taken from the pseudo-historical Kojiki and Nihon Shoki, which are collectively known as Kiki (記紀) or Japanese chronicles. These chronicles include legends and myths, as well as potential historical facts that have since been exaggerated and/or distorted over time. It is recorded in the Kiki that Kenzō was born to Hae-hime (荑媛) sometime in 449 or 450 AD and was given the name Woke no Sumeramikoto (弘計天皇 or 袁祁王). At the time Woke already had an older brother named Oke no Sumeramikoto (億計天皇), and the two were both grandsons of Emperor Richū.

Woke would have been quite young when Emperor Yūryaku shot the arrow which killed his father, Ichinobe no Oshiwa during a hunting expedition. Fearful of their lives, both Prince Woke and his older brother, Prince Oke chose to flee into the countryside. According to Harima no Kuni Fudoki, they found refuge at Akashi in Harima Province where they hid by living in obscurity. Histories from that period explained that the two brothers sought to blend into this rural community by posing as common herdsmen. The Kiki then splits on the narrative on how the two Princes were re-discovered.

According to the Kojiki, both Princes were re-discovered after the death of Emperor Seinei as officials searched for a successor to the late Emperor. The Nihon Shoki on the other hand gives a different account as the Emperor is alive and well when the Princes were found. Their discovery allegedly occurred when a newly appointed governor came to Akashi to attend a festival. Woke pleaded with his older brother to reveal themselves given this great opportunity to do so. After Oke relented, the two communicated their status to the governor through song and dance. The now shocked governor re-introduced the lost cousins to Emperor Seinei, who adopted both of them as sons and heirs.

Woke wanted his elder brother to become Emperor; but Oke refused. As the two struggled for a year to reach an agreement Princess Iitoyo (their sister or aunt) allegedly became a de-facto regent. The great men of the court insisted that one or the other of the brothers must accept the throne; but in the end, Woke proved to be more adamant. Prince Woke agreed to accept the throne; and Kenzō was ultimately proclaimed as the new Emperor—which created a sense of relief for all the people who had endured this period of uncertainty.

=== Reign ===
Both the Koiki and Nihon Shoki come back into agreement for events during Emperor Kenzō's reign.

== Historical assessment ==
This sample page from Nihon Ōdai Ichiran (1834) represents the first published account of Emperor Kenzō's reign to become available in the West.

There is no evidence to suggest that the title tennō (meaning "emperor") was used during the time to which Kenzō's reign has been assigned. Instead, his title could have possibly been Sumeramikoto or Amenoshita Shiroshimesu Ōkimi (治天下大王), meaning "the great king who rules all under heaven", or ヤマト大王/大君 "Great King of Yamato". The name Kenzō-tennō was more than likely assigned to him posthumously by later generations. His name might have been regularized centuries after the lifetime ascribed to Kenzō, possibly during the time in which legends about the origins of the imperial dynasty were compiled as the chronicles known today as the Kojiki.

Outside of the Kiki, the reign of Emperor Kinmei (Note: The 29th Emperor) (c. 509 – 571 AD) is the first for which contemporary historiography has been able to assign verifiable dates. The conventionally accepted names and dates of the early Emperors were not confirmed as "traditional" until the reign of Emperor Kanmu (Note: Kanmu was the 50th sovereign of the imperial dynasty) between 737 and 806 AD.

While the actual site of Kenzō's grave is not known, he is traditionally venerated at a memorial Shinto shrine (misasagi) in Osaka. As designated by the Imperial Household Agency as Kenzō's mausoleum, its formal name is Kataoka no Iwatsuki no oka no kita no misasagi. Kenzō is also enshrined at the Imperial Palace along with other emperors and members of the Imperial Family at the Three Palace Sanctuaries.

It is recorded that his capital was at Chikatsu Asuka no Yatsuri no Miya (近飛鳥八釣宮) in Yamato Province. The location of the palace is thought to have been in present-day Osaka Prefecture or Nara Prefecture.

Murray reports that the only event of major consequence during Kenzō's reign had to do with the filial respect he showed for his murdered father. Kenzō arranged to have his father's remains retrieved and re-interred in a mausoleum appropriate for the son of an Emperor and the father of another.

Kenzō died at age 37, reigning only three years. He too had no other heirs; so his brother would follow him on the throne. His Empress was Princess Naniwa-no-Ono (難波小野王; d.489), Prince Oka-no-Wakugo's daughter (also Prince Iwaki's granddaughter and Emperor Yuryaku's great-granddaughter).

== Consorts and children ==
Empress (Kōgō): Princess Naniwa-no-Ono (難波小野王; d.489), Prince Oka-no-Wakugo's daughter (also Prince Iwaki's granddaughter and Emperor Yuryaku's great-granddaughter)

== See also ==
- Princess Iitoyo
- Imperial cult

== Notes ==
Japanese Imperial kamon — a stylized chrysanthemum blossom

Regnal titles
Preceded by Emperor Seinei	Emperor of Japan: Kenzō; 485 – 487 (traditional dates)	Succeeded by Emperor Ninken
