= Iitoyo =

Iitoyo (written: 飯豊) is a Japanese name. Notable people with the name include:

- Princess Iitoyo (440–484), Japanese Imperial princess and possible empress regnant
- Marie Iitoyo (born 1998), Japanese actress and fashion model
