= Princess Naniwa no Ono =

Naniwa no Ono

Empress consort of Japan
- Tenure: 485–489
- Died: 489
- Spouse: Emperor Kenzō
- House: Imperial House of Japan
- Father: Prince Oka-no-Wakugo

Princess Naniwa no Ono (also Nanihaonu) (? – 489) was Empress of Japan as the consort of Emperor Kenzō.

Princess Naniwa was the daughter of Prince Oka-no-Wakugo and great-granddaughter of Emperor Yūryaku.

After her husband's death, and the accession of his successor, Naniwa committed suicide, possibly due to fears over having disrespected Emperor Ninken when he was crown prince.

== Notes ==
Japanese royalty
| Preceded by Kusaka no Hatabi no hime | Empress consort of Japan; 485–489 | Succeeded by Princess Kasuga no Ōiratsume |
