= Motoko Katakura =

Japanese university teacher (1937–2013)

Motoko Katakura 片倉もとこ
- Born: Motoko Shintani 新谷素子; October 17, 1937. Nara, Nara
- Died: February 23, 2013 (aged 75)
- Other name: 片倉素子
- Occupation: Cultural anthropology (Middle Eastern Studies)
- Known for: the first woman director of the International Research Center for Japanese Studies (May 2005)
- Notable work: "Bedouin village: a study of a Saudi Arabian people in transition" (1977)

Motoko Katakura (片倉もとこ (素子)) (née Niiya, 17 October 1937 - 23 February 2013) was a Japanese anthropologist who specialized in the Islamic world.

== Early life ==
Born in Nara Prefecture in Japan, she moved to Kanagawa Prefecture and finished high school in 1956. She was admitted to Tsuda College as an English Language major and studied abroad during her senior year to graduate in 1962. (Note: Studying in the United States in 1961, Katakura had a chance to talk with an activist for the independence of Algeria which she recalled when she encountered with Islam culture.) She earned her Master of Letters in 1968 at the Chuo University Graduate School, and conducted research at Columbia University between 1971 and 1972 as a visiting research fellow.

== Islamic world and multicultural studies ==
Katakura's main field of study was focused on the Islamic world including bedouin, and multicultural studies. In late 1960s she visited bedouin camps in Saudi Arabia for her first field research in Islamic culture, while the Katakuras lived there. Abdur-Rahim Al Aḥmadī was the best supporter for Katakura's field work in Saudi Arabia since the early stage of her research in late 1960s. He witnessed that Katakura went into the nomad society of Wadi Fatima (western Saudi Arabia) and lived among those people for a period, and she visited them several times over the years. Katakura proceeded on-site research while winning the trust and affection of those people, observing the cultural heritage of their society. Working as a lecturer at her alma mater Tsuda College between 1973 and '74, she obtained PhD. of Geology at Graduate School of University of Tokyo, faculty of Science in 1974. Promoted as an associate professor, she continued working at Tsuda College, and her hard work and tenacity on research and field work was rewarded when she published the survey results in her first book under the title of "Bedouin Village" in 1977. (Note: "Bedouin village" attracted much reviews.) She appreciated the contribution and support Abdur-Rahim Al Ahmadi had offered her, and asked him writing the preface to the Arabic version of that title. (Note: Originally published on arabic newspaper "al-Ḥayāh" (Al hayat) as an interview.)

== Among academic circles ==
With thorough academic papers followed the first book, she proofed that scientific values and her challenges in cultural anthropology was confirmed. Katakura started to extend the basis of her research during and after her tenure as a lecturer at University of Tokyo between 1975 and 1977, that Katakura gave lectures at International Christian University for the term of 1975/76 and 1977/78. Her teaching career extended at Tsuda College in 1978 to 1981. At the National Ethnographic Museum in Osaka she researched the Islamic world and multicultural studies including bedouin and desert culture in 1981 to 1993 at National Museum of Ethnology as a professor, where she became a professor emeritus in later years.

For multiculture studies, she actively researched abroad on many offers such as a visiting professor at University of British Columbia (1985–1986), a visiting research fellow at Research Center for Arabian Literature (1987–1988). Coming back to Japan, she was a professor at the Graduate University for Advanced Studies (1989–1993). Kunio Katakura was appointed the ambassador to Iraq and spent years over there during the early part of Gulf War. In Japan, in May 1990, the Japanese Association of Arid Land Studies was founded with Katakura as the first vice director. (Note: Since 2014, the Motoko Katakura Foundation for Desert Culture has been presenting an annual prize "Katakura Motoko Prize" at the Japanese Association of Arid Land Studies, in honor of Motoko Katakura with a silver medal. The first prize was presented to two scholars of desert research and studies from Tottori University.) It was in 1993 when Katakura professed at Chuo University at the Faculty of Policy Studies which started the same year, before she was nominated and became the director of the International Research Center for Japanese Studies in May 2005. The director of that Center had been succeeded from Takeshi Umehara to Hayao Kawai and Tetsuo Yamaori, all who were past professors at the center, and Katakura filled her post as the first woman director without former tenure with them. Following her retirement in 2008, she became a professor emeritus at the center.

== Episodes ==
She was married to Kunio Katakura and lived overseas as a wife of a diplomat. In the United States of America, they made acquaintance with Hisashi Owada who was also a diplomat, and she recalled many times that she and her husband met his daughter Masako, the future Crown Princess of Japan during those years. During the early part of the Gulf War, she was on her research in Japan, while her husband was appointed in Iraq.

Katakura applied hiragana transcription when she got married and changed her family name to Katakura. A fortune teller advised Katakura that there were no problem to apply kanji to both her first and maiden name, or Motoko Shintani. However, the combination of both her first name and married name in kanji did not show good omen. Based on that advice, she transcribed her first name in kana rather than in kanji. On the first day at the National Museum of Ethnology as a professor, it was not quite comfortable for her to find her name inscribed in kanji only on the nameplate to her office, as she confessed in her essay.

Katakura Motoko died on 23 February 2013 at the age of 75.

== Motoko Katakura Foundation for Desert Culture ==
To honor Katakura Motoko's passion for her research, Motoko Katakura Foundation for Desert Culture was inaugurated on 7 November 2013, with her husband Katakura Kunio as the Councilor chairperson. It was a part of their aim to honor the desert culture which was yet to be popular in Japan, and they presented the first "Yutorogi Prize" to Mr and Mrs. Tadashi Nagahama of Nihon Baiobirejji Kyokai (日本バイオビレッジ協会) for their continued effort and dedication to desertification control activities in the Inner Mongolia Autonomous Region, China, for over twenty years. The Nagahamas had met Katakura in 1990, and she had encouraged them over the years and left a will to include them as a recipient. (Note: The Foundation notes their purpose to inherit and abide to Katakura's original intention by contributing to "the understanding of desert culture" as well as "treasure the desert culture carefully" and "appreciate the beauty of the desert itself." To organize documents and references of late Motoko Katakura and make them accessible to researchers was the project it puts emphasis as well as plan and donate to other institutions. Motoko Katakura Foundation for Desert Culture supports research and inter-disciplinary studies on desert culture, granted aids to publish books and media on desert culture, both at home and in the international market. It is another project the foundation will take care of, and artistic activities themed around desert culture will be granted support. Workshops and exhibitions are sponsored by the foundation, aiming at to introduce page to wider audience. They support seminars, symposium and research presentations for the circle of the desert culture studies, as well as those lecture projects to dispatch lecturers to classrooms.)

== Awards and prizes ==
- 1980 Award for the Promotion of Studies on Developing Countries, Institute of Developing Economics, Japan External Trade Organization (Note: KATAKURA Motoko, professor emeritus at the International Research Center for Japanese Studies; professor emeritus, National Museum of Ethnology; professor emeritus, the Graduate University for Advanced Studies.)
- 1981 the first Kakami Kinen Zaidan Yushu Tosho Sho (Kakami Foundation Book Prize for Literature)
- 1983 the sixth Sekiyu Bunka Sho (Petroleum Culture Award)
- 1984 the third Esso Kenkyu Shorei Sho (Esso Research Promotion Award)
- 1991 Daido Life Insurance Regional Studies Award

== Committee membership ==
- 1965 - The Association of Japanese Geographers, Member
- 1970 - Middle East Studies Association of North America (MESA), Member
- 1970 - Society of Woman Geographers, Member
- 1983 - British Society for Middle Eastern Studies, Member
- 1985 - Japan Association for Middle Eastern Studies, Councilor, director (1987)
- 1987 - Japan Society for Comparative Study of Civilizations, vice president (2002), director (2005)
- 1989 - The Japanese Association for Arid Land Studies, vice president, vice director (1990)
- 1989 - Collegium Mediterranistarum, director, vice president (1996).
- 1991 - Japan Association for Nile-Ethiopian Studies, director
- 1992 - The Japanese Society of Ethnology, councilor
- 1997 – The Society for Near Eastern Studies in Japan, director
- 2005 − The Institute of Eastern Culture, councilor

== Affiliated academic societies ==
- The Association of Japanese Geographers
- British Society for Middle Eastern Studies
- Collegium Mediterranistarum
- The Institute of Eastern Culture
- Japan Association for Middle Eastern Studies
- Japan Association for Nile-Ethiopian Studies
- The Japanese Association for Arid Land Studies
- The Japan Society for Comparative Study of Civilizations
- The Japanese Society of Ethnology
- Middle East Studies Association of North America (MESA)
- The Society for Near Eastern Studies in Japan
- Society of Woman Geographers

== Projects ==
- "Challenges Facing Women", 1960
- "Book Review: Ethico-Religious Concepts in the Qur'ān by Toshihiko Izutsu". Contemporary Religions in Japan. 8 (2). Nanzan University: 186–190. 1 June 1967. ISSN 0010-7557. OCLC 5542887844.
- "The Disintegration of the Matrilineal Family in Early Arabia reflected in the Quran". Japanese Association for Religious Studies (197). 1968.
- Yabaniya fi Wadi Fatima, Al-Madinat Al-Muhawwara Jidda, Saudi Arabia, 1969
- Socio-economic Structure of Qura in Wadi Fatima, Kingkom of Saudi Arabian Government, 1970
- Katakura, Motoko (1973). "Some Social Aspects of Bedouin Settlements in Wadi Fatima, Saudi Arabia". Orient. 9 (9): 67–108. doi:10.5356/orient1960.9.67. ISSN 0473-3851.
- Katakura (July 8, 1974). "An Anthropogeigraphical Study of Saudi Arabian Bedouin Communities" (Ko, 3482). ndlc:UT51. University of Tokyo (0021). dissertation for PhD. Science, 1974.
- Faculty of Science, ed. (1974). "Socioeconomic Structure of a Bedouin Settlement--A Case Study of Buchur Saudi Arabia". Bulletin of the Department of Geography (6). University of Tokyo. ISSN 0082-478X. OCLC 3624538.
- "The Value of Student Exchange in Cross-Cultural Relations". Dyalogue-Middle East and Japan, Symposiumon. Cultural Exchange, The Japan Foundation. 1977.
- The Tokyo University Scientific Mission for the Comparative Study of the Foggara Oasis in the Arid Zone of the Old Continent, ed. (1980). "Socio-Economic Structure of an Oasus Settlement--A case Study of Taube, Syria". Report: Qanawat Romani of Taibe Oasis (1).
- "Qaunawat Ramani of Taibe Oasis". The Preliminary Report of Tokyo University Scientific Mission to Syria. 1980.
- Tawfic E. Farah, ed. (1984). "Political Behavior in the Arab States" (39).
- "Sources of Mutual Ignorance". Cross Currents (2). 1980.
- The Tokyo University Scientific Mission for the Comparative Study of the Foggara Oasis in the Arid Zone of the Old Continent, ed. (1982). "The Mobility and the Spatial Reality of the Taibe Villages in the Syrian Desert". Report: Case Study of Foggara Oasis in the Algerian Sahara and Syria (2).
- The Islamic World and Japan (1983). "Human Relations in Islam: The Group and the Individual in Arab Muslim Communities".
- Tawfic E. Farah, ed. (1984). "Political Behavior in the Arab States" (39).
- "The Mobility and the Spatial Reality of the Taibe Villages in the Syrian Desert". Case Studies of Foggara Oases in the Algerian Sahara and Syria. 1984.
- "Omani Culture Bound for Japan". Oman Daily Observer. 1984.
- "Desert Settlement: Saudi Arabia". Communities Around Our World. 1984.
- "Coexistence in the Islamic World". Echoes of Peace (34). 1991.
- "Can Japanese Culture be a Counter Civilization in the Trend of Globalization?". Minato International Bulletin. 1995.
- "Islamization or Localization? From the Cultural Anthropological Observations of Prural 'islams'". Asia and Islam. 1996.
- "Maritime nation symposium". The Daily Yomiuri. July 2002.
- "Japan as a Multi-Cultural Society: In the Era of Cultural Mobility". Nichibunken Newsletter (60). 2005.

== Bibliography ==
- Katakura, Motoko (1977). Bedouin village: a study of a Saudi Arabian people in transition. The modern Middle East series (in Japanese). Tokyo: U.P. OCLC 784944344. With foreword by J. C. Hurewitz.
- Katakura, Motoko; Sato, Nobuyuki; Aoyanagi, Kiyotaki (1977). Bunka jinruigaku: yuboku, nōkō, toshi (in Japanese). Tokyo: Yachiyo Shuppan. OCLC 673000535.
- Vidal, F. S (1 April 1978). "Book Review: Bedouin Village: A Study of a Saudi Arabian People in Transition". Middle East Journal. 32 (2): 219–220. ISSN 0026-3141. OCLC 5547390495.
- Vidal, F. S. (1978). "Book Review: Bedouin Village: A Study of a Saudi Arabian People in Transition". Middle East Journal. 32 (2 (Spring)). Middle East Institute: 219–220. JSTOR 4325748.
- Masry, Abdullah H (1 May 1978). "JOURNAL ARTICLE Review: Bedouin Village: A Study Of A Saudi Arabian People In Transition By Motoko Katakura". Middle East Studies Association Bulletin. 12 (2). Middle East Studies Association of North America (MESA): 36–37. doi:10.1017/S0026318400006210. JSTOR 23057984.
- Bidwell, Robin (July 1978). "JOURNAL ARTICLE Review: Bedouin Village: A Study Of A Saudi Arabian People In Transition By Motoko Katakura". The Geographical Journal. 144 (2). geographicalj: 315. doi:10.2307/634162. ISSN 0016-7398. JSTOR 634162. OCLC 5548821610.
- Katakura, Motoko (1978). Village bédouin: A study of Saudi Arabian people in transition. Annales de Géographie (in French). Translated by Beaujeu-Garnier, Jacqueline. PERSEE. OCLC 928533801.
- Katakura (1979). Arabia nōto: Arabu no genzō wo motomete. NHK Books (in Japanese). Nihon Hōsō Shuppan Kyōkai. OCLC 834537173.
- Katakura (1981). "Human relations in Islam: the group and the individual in Arab Muslim communities". The Islamic World and Japan: In Pursuit of Mutual Understanding. Japan Foundation Reference Series (6). Kokusai Kōryū Kikin. OCLC 10924290.
- Cole, Donald Powell (1982). Yuboku no tami bedoin. Gendai kyoyo bunko (in Japanese). Motoko Katakura (translator); ncid: BN04840596. Shakai shizosha. OCLC 673238192.
- Katakura, Motoko; Nakasato, Nariaki; Intaratai, Kunton; et al. (1986). Ima ajia o kangaeru. Sanseido sensho (in Japanese). ISBN 9784385431314. OCLC 47436778.
- Katakura (1986). Yūzō Itagaki (ed.). Zoku ninshiki kara mita kazoku. Kōza Isuramu (in Japanese). Vol. 4. Chikuma Shobō. ISBN 9784480357045. OCLC 47367549.
- Matsuo, Hiroshi; Onuki, Masao; Fukui, Katsuyoshi (1986). Ibunka taiken no susume. Asahi karuchā bukkusu (in Japanese). Vol. 62. Ōsaka Shoseki.
- Katakura; et al. (1987). Gendai Isuramu shōjiten. Enaji shojiten (in Japanese). Esso Sekiyu Kabushiki Kaisha Kōhōbu. OCLC 22796569.
- Katakura (1987). Hitobito no Isurāmu: sono gakusaiteki kenkyū (in Japanese). Nihon hoso shuppan kyokai. ISBN 9784140091180. OCLC 19390205.
- Katakura (1987). Sabakue, nobiyakani [Into the desert, with free mind] (in Japanese). Chikuma shobo. ISBN 9784480853905. OCLC 672666966.
- Morimoto, Tetsurō; Katakura, Motoko (1988). Happī arabia hansō shindobaddo no fune [Happy Arabian voyage: Sindbad and his boat]. Enueichikei umi no shirukurōdo (in Japanese). Nihon Hōsō Kyōkai. Nihon Hōsō Shuppan Kyōkai. ISBN 9784140085691. OCLC 833252716.
- Katakura (15 February 1988). "Ibunka kankyo no arabu musurimu: Vancouver no ejiputojin musurimu no jireikenkyu" [Muslims in a Non-Islamic Environment: With Focus on Arab Muslims in Canada]. Research Report (in Japanese). 12. Osaka: National Museum of Ethnology: 681–726. OCLC 931973378.
- Katakura (19 March 1990). "Ibunka kankyo no arabu musurimu: Vancouver no ejiputojin musurimu no jireikenkyu" [Muslims in a Non-Islamic Environment: A Case Study of Egyptian Community in Vancouver, Canada]. Research Report (in Japanese). 14. Osaka: National Museum of Ethnology: 821–889. OCLC 931973378.
- Katakura (1991). Isuramu no nichijo sekai. Iwanami shinsho: Shin akaban (in Japanese). Iwanami shoten. ISBN 9784004301547. OCLC 166445361.
- Katakura, Kunio; Katakura, Motoko (1991). Japan and the Middle East (in Japanese). Tokyo: The Middle East Institute of Japan. OCLC 716153349.
- Katakura (1994). Isuramu kyoto no shakai to seikatsu. Koza isuramu sekai. Eiko kyoiku bunka kenkyusho. ISBN 9784946424847. OCLC 674474764.
- Katakura (1995). "Ido bunkako": Isuramuno sekaiwo tazunete. The Nikkei. ISBN 9784532161460. OCLC 674769474.
- Arima, Makiko; Katakura, Motoko; Honma, Nagayo (March 1998). "Teidan: ibunka e no kyokanteki rikai o". Gaiko Forum: Journal of Japanese Perspectives on Diplomacy (in Japanese). 11 (3). (DLC) 2003210134; (OCoLC) 47130683. Toshi Shuppan: 15–22. ISSN 0915-1281. OCLC 5180538905.
- Katakura (27 December 2001). Faculty of Policy Studies, Chuo University (ed.). "Chi to hito to: 21-seiki no ajia kenyu wo kangeru (koen)" [The People and the Land: A Discussion on Asian Studies in Transition (lecture)]. The Journal of Sophia Asian Studies (in Japanese) (19). Sophia University: 213–231.
- Katakura (1 February 2002). "Isuramu: keitozu, sho gakuha; zukai, reihai". Daihorin (in Japanese). 69 (1): 84–91. OCLC 5175717880.
- Maqsood, Ruqaiyyah Waris (2003). Katakura, Motoko (ed.). Isuramu o shiru 32-sho (in Japanese). Translated by Takeda, Nobuko. Akashi shoten. ISBN 9784750317786. OCLC 676504161.
- Katakura, Motoko; Senba, Yuri (July 2003). Faculty of Policy Studies, Chuo University (ed.). "Taminzoku kyosei shakai toshiteno nihon wo kangaeru: zainichi musurimu ni taisuru nihon seifu, chiho jichitai, minkan no taio" [Japan as Multi-Ethnic Society: Various Receptivity toward Muslim Immigrants in Japan]. Sogo Seisaku Kenkyu (in Japanese) (10): 209–224. ISSN 1341-7827. OCLC 5175851750.
- Katakura (June 2004). Gunshuku shimin no kai (ed.). "Saramu o sodateru: kokka no boryoku, tero no boryoku o koete / Special issue:United Nations, escape from state violence". Gunshuku Mondai Shiryo (Disarmament Review) (in Japanese) (284): 24–29. ISSN 0287-0177. OCLC 5173983726.
- "Katakura Motoko sensei no koen" [Professor Motoko Katakura's lectures]. Bulletin of Graduate University for Advanced Studies. Shinpo-shugi no atotsugi ha nanika (325). 14 December 2006.
- Katakura (May 2007). "Takasei to kyokasei: nihonjin no ibunka juyo o megutte" [Takasei and kyokasei: the Japanese disposition for digesting outside cultures]. Bulletin of International Research Center for Japanese Studies (Nihon Kenkyu) (in Japanese). 35. International Research Center for Japanese Studies: 19–78. ISSN 0915-0900. OCLC 5170963987.
- Katakura (December 2008). Keizai kurabu (ed.). "Nihon no takasei firudo-waku kara mita sekai to nihon". Keizai Kurabu Koenroku (in Japanese) (718). Toyo keizai shinsha: 2–28. OCLC 5172173956.
- Isuramu no sekaikan: "Ido bunka" wo kangaeru. Iwanami gendai bunko :・shakai. Iwanami shoten. 2008. ISBN 9784006031619. OCLC 676284770.
- Yutorogi: isuramu no yutakana jikan (in Japanese). Iwanami shoten. 2008. ISBN 9784000254069. OCLC 675336443.
- Katakura (2009). Yasumu genki motanai yuki: Yutorogi no shiso ni manabu ikiru chie. Shodensha. ISBN 9784396613334. OCLC 676577838.
- Katakura (2013). Tabidachi no ki. Chuo koronshinsha. ISBN 9784120044984. OCLC 853286716.
