= Delmer Brown =

American Japanologist

Delmer M. Brown
- Born: November 20, 1909; Harrisonville, Missouri, U.S.
- Died: November 9, 2011 (aged 101); California, U.S.
- Education: Stanford University; Santa Ana Junior College
- Occupations: Educator, author
- Employer: UC Berkeley (1946–77)
- Spouses: Mary Nelson Logan (1934–87; her death); Margaret Young (–2003; her death); Louise K. Weamer (–2010; her death)
- Partner: Pauline Howland (–2011; his death)
- Awards: Order of the Sacred Treasure, Gold Rays with Neck Ribbon (Japan)
- Military career
- Allegiance: United States
- Branch: United States Navy
- Conflicts: World War II

Delmer Myers Brown (November 20, 1909 – November 9, 2011) was an American academic, historian, writer, translator and Japanologist. He was a professor of Japanese history at the University of California at Berkeley.

== Early life, education, and personal life ==
Brown was born on November 20, 1909, in Harrisonville, Missouri, and grew up in Kansas City, Missouri. In 1925, he moved with his family to Santa Ana, California. He attended Santa Ana Junior College and then Stanford University, where he graduated with a degree in history in 1932.

Instead of going to law school, as originally planned, Brown took a position teaching English at a prestigious Japanese Imperial "Higher School" in Kanazawa, Ishikawa, Japan. It was there that he met and married Mary Nelson Logan in 1934.

During World War II, Brown served as an intelligence officer in the U.S. Navy.

Brown earned his Ph.D. in Japanese history from Stanford in 1946.

In 1987, Mary died after 53 years of marriage. Brown was widowed twice more; by Margaret Young Brown in 2003 and Louise K. Weamer in 2010. He is survived by his companion Pauline Howland, two sisters, a son and three step-children, two granddaughters, and six great-grandchildren.

Brown died on November 9, 2011, following a stroke.

== Career ==
From 1946 to 1977, Brown was a member of the faculty of the University of California, Berkeley. He was chairman of the history department from 1957 to 1961 and 1971 to 1975.

Brown was awarded a Fulbright Scholarship in Japan from 1959 to 1960.

In 1998, Brown started the process of establishing the Japanese Historical Text Initiative (JHTI), which is a searchable online database of Japanese historical documents and English translations. It is part of the Center for Japanese Studies at the University of California, Berkeley. The development of JHTI involved negotiations with the University of Tokyo Press and Japan's National Institute of Japanese Literature.

== Selected works ==
In an overview of writings by and about Brown, OCLC/WorldCat lists roughly 40+ works in 80+ publications in 4 languages and 1,500+ library holdings.

- Nationalism in Japan: An Introductory Historical Analysis, 1955
- Japan, 1967
- The future and the Past: A Translation and Study of the Gukanshō, an Interpretative History of Japan Written in 1219 by Jien, 1979
- Chronology of Japan = 日本の歴史, 1987
- An Introduction to Advanced Spoken Japanese, 1987
- The Cambridge History of Japan, Vol. 1, Ancient Japan , 1993

== Honors ==
- Order of the Sacred Treasure, Gold Rays with Neck Ribbon (Japan)
