= Aozora Bunko =

Japanese digital library

- 青空文庫
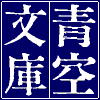
- Location: Japan
- Type: Digital library
- Established: 7 July 1997

Collection
- Size: Over 17,700 works (as of January 2026)
- Criteria for collection: Japanese works in public domain or allowed by author

Other information
- Website: www.aozora.gr.jp

Aozora Bunko (青空文庫, lit. 'Blue Sky Library', also known as the "Open Air Library") is a Japanese digital library. It encompasses several thousand works of Japanese-language fiction and non-fiction. These include out-of-copyright books and works the authors wish to make freely available.

Since its inception in 1997, Aozora Bunko has been both the compiler and publisher of an evolving online catalog. In 2006, Aozora Bunko began to take on a role as a public policy advocate to protect its current and anticipated catalog of freely accessible e-books.

== History and operation ==
This is an explanatory illustration prepared by Aozora Bunko as part of a project encouraging Japanese citizens to contact Diet members in an effort to express a point-of-view.

Aozora Bunko was created in 1997 to provide broadly available, free access to Japanese literary works whose copyrights had expired. The driving force behind the project was Michio Tomita (ja: 富田 倫生, 1952–2013), who was motivated by the belief that people with a common interest should cooperate with each other.

In Japan, Aozora Bunko is considered similar to Project Gutenberg. Most of the texts provided are works of Japanese literature, with some translations of English literature included as well. The resources are searchable by category, author, or title, with detailed explanations on how to use the platform The files can be downloaded in PDF or viewed online in HTML.

After the passing of Michio Tomita in 2013, the Future of Books Fund (本の未来基金, hon no mirai kikin) was established independently to assist funding and operations for Aozora Bunko.

Aozora Bunko hosts more than 17,700 books as of 22 January 2026.

== Public policy advocacy ==
Aozora Bunko joined with others in organizing to oppose changes to Japanese copyright law. They have encouraged Japanese citizens to submit letters and petitions to the Japanese Agency for Cultural Affairs and to members of the Japanese Diet.

Graphic icon illustrating Aozora Bunko's opposition to proposed changes to Japan's copyright laws

Japan and other countries accepted the terms of the Berne Convention for the Protection of Literary and Artistic Works, an 1886 international agreement about common copyright policies. Aozora Bunko adopted an advocacy role in favor of continuing with the statu quo, wherein laws do not go beyond the minimum copyright terms of the Berne Convention. These laws have copyrights that run for the lifetime of the author plus 50 years, which Aozora Bunko believes is preferable to changes proposed by numerous influential groups pushing for longer copyright terms.

The evolution of Aozora Bunko from a digital library to a public policy advocacy organization developed only after the perceived threat to the Aozora Bunko catalog and mission became otherwise unavoidable.

== Problems ==
Aozora Bunko pointed out that the extension of the copyright term had been influenced by the document titled "The U.S.–Japan Regulatory Reform and Competition Policy Initiative." Through these annual reports, the US Government was requiring that the protected period of copyright should be extended: 70 years after one's death for a work by an individual, and 95 years after publication for a work by a corporation. In response, the Agency for Cultural Affairs in Japan expressed that a conclusion would be obtained at the Council for Cultural Affairs copyright subcommittee by the end of 2007. If the legal revision extending the protected period of copyright were actually carried out, Aozora Bunko would be forced to stop publishing books that had already been or were about to be released, due to the 20-year extension of copyright protection. Therefore, Aozora Bunko released a counter-declaration against enforcement of the revised law on 1 January 2005, and they started to collect the signatures for a petition on 1 January 2007.

Due to the regime change in Japan in 2009, the Japanese government stopped receiving these reports from the US government. Aozora Bunko did not respond to this, and their petition opposing the extension of the copyright term was discontinued after the October 2008 revision. Instead of the document, the website of the Office of the United States Trade Representative inserted the "United States–Japan Economic Harmonization Initiative" in February 2011. In the document, the US government promoted the extension of copyright law for the protection of intellectual property rights toward the Japanese government so that it would be "in line with emerging global trends, including those of its OECD counterparts and major trading partners."

On 30 December 2018, Japan did extend the period to 70 years, which was a requirement from the EU–Japan Economic Partnership Agreement.

== See also ==
- Wikisource
- List of digital library projects
- Open Content Alliance
  - UK: Gowers Review of Intellectual Property
  - US: Copyright Term Extension Act
- Project Runeberg
- Open Rights Group
- Philosophy of copyright
  - Permission culture
- Japanese Historical Text Initiative
