= Jinnō Shōtōki =

14th-century chronicle of Japanese history by Kitabatake Chikafusa

Kitabatake Chikafusa, the author of Jinnō Shōtōki

Jinnō Shōtōki (神皇正統記; "Chronicles of the Authentic Lineages of the Divine Emperors") is a Japanese historical book written by Kitabatake Chikafusa. The work sought both to clarify the genesis and potential consequences of a contemporary crisis in Japanese politics, and to dispel or at least ameliorate the prevailing disorder.

The text begins with these statements as prologue:

Great Japan is the divine land. The heavenly progenitor founded it, and the sun goddess bequeathed it to her descendants to rule eternally. Only in our country is this true; there are no similar examples in other countries. This is why our country is called the divine land.

== History ==
Chikafusa had been a careful student of the book Nihon Shoki (日本書紀, "The Chronicles of Japan"), and this background is reflected in the narrative structure of his Jinnō Shōtōki. He was also well acquainted with Watarai Ieyuki (度会家行), a prominent Shinto priest at the Ise Shrine. Watarai's life of study significantly clarified the theory of Ise Shinto, and this point-of-view is reflected in the tone of Jinnō Shōtōki.

The work as a whole was written in the years 1338–1341 at Oda fortress in Hitachi Province, Japan (present-day Tsukuba City, Ibaraki Prefecture) and then amended in 1343 at Seki fortress.

It is believed that the significant portions of the text were probably drafted in the autumn of 1339, around the time Emperor Go-Daigo died and his successor Go-Murakami was enthroned. Current scholars accept that the original text is missing and that all extant versions of the text thus are manuscript versions that differ slightly from the original. A sense of immediacy seems to inform the writing, and this may be due to the narrative having a specific, more narrowly focused purpose—to instruct the young Emperor Go-Murakami (r. 1339-1368). A curious sentence on the last page of the work, "This book is directed to some child", has been interpreted as a dedication to either Go-Murakami or Yuki Chikatomo.

== Analysis ==
In Jinnō Shōtōki, the reign of each emperor from the mythological period to the enthronement of Go-Murakami is described, together with personal observations by Chikafusa based on his own political and ethical beliefs. The chronicles thus serve as a context for Chikafusa to expound his views about appropriate conduct for Japanese sovereigns, and thereby attempt to justify the legitimacy of the Southern Court.

The book greatly encouraged the faction supporting the Southern Court during the Nanboku-chō period. Chikafusa's work was all the more important because of the relative weakness of the Southern Court in its extended military campaign against the Northern Court armies. The book was early recognized as a compelling and subtle analysis of the history of Japan and its emperors. From the very beginning, it was read not only by adherents of the Southern Court, but also by supporters of the Northern Court. However, its criticism of Ashikaga Takauji was not well received in Northern Court circles, and that section of the original text was omitted in manuscript copies which circulated outside the ambit of the Southern Court.

Chikafusa argued that possessing the Imperial Regalia of Japan is an absolute and indispensable condition for being recognized as a Japanese monarch. Chikafusa contended that much about the Japanese form of government was demonstrably ideal, and that it is both appropriate and beneficial for the emperor and court nobles to rule and for the samurai and others to be led by them.

After the Northern and Southern courts were reunited, a curious, self-styled "sequel" to Jinnō Shōtōki was circulated. The book, written by Ozuki Harutomi (小槻晴富), was created under the influence of the Ashikaga shogunate for the purpose of justifying the legitimacy of the Northern Court.

== Mito scholarship ==
Tokugawa Mitsukuni, the Edo-period daimyō of the Mito Domain, valued Chikafusa's work highly, a view which he expressed in the Japanese chronicle Dai Nihonshi (大日本史): "History of Great Japan". Mitsukuni's patronage ensured that the perspectives and ideology of Jinnō Shōtōki were propounded at the Mito Academy (水戸学). These pre-Meiji influences contributed to the development of the Kō Koku Shi Kan (皇国史観), a view of history in which Japan is regarded as a divine nation governed by emperors in a single family line from its beginning. These concepts became even more important in the national ideology under Japanese militarism during World War II.

Today, Jinnō Shōtōki stands on its own literary and historical merits. According to historian John Brownlee, it has taken on added value over the course of the centuries. He opines that Chikafusa's work manages to inspire and that because it does, the book effectively mirrors the serial responses of readers and thinkers throughout the periods in which it has been studied and pondered. Alternatively, Brownlee surmises that the work's value may have accrued because a gifted, original and mature mind "made its way onto the level of secular historical explanation".

== See also ==
- Historiographical Institute of the University of Tokyo
- International Research Center for Japanese Studies
- Japanese Historical Text Initiative
- Historiography of Japan
