= Motoko =

- Gender: female

Origin
- Origin: Japanese
- Meaning: It can have many different meanings depending on the kanji used.

Motoko is a feminine Japanese given name.

== Written forms ==
- もとこ (hiragana)

Possible forms in kanji include:

- 素子 "unadorned, plain, undecorated, child"
- 元子 "origin, child"
- 基子 "fundamental, child"
- 資子 "resourceful, child"

== People with the name ==
- Motoko Arai (新井 素子), Japanese writer
- Motoko Fujimoto (索子), a Japanese softball player
- Hani Motoko (羽仁 もと子), the first female Japanese journalist
- Motoko Hirotsu (広津 素子), Japanese politician
- Motoko Fujishiro Huthwaite (1927–2020), American teacher
- Motoko Ishii (幹子), a Japanese lighting designer
- Motoko Katakura (1937–2013), Japanese anthropologist
- Motoko Kotani (born 1960), Japanese applied mathematician
- Motoko Kumai (統子, born 1970), a Japanese voice actress
- Motoko Obayashi (素子), a Japanese volleyball player
- Motoko Rich, American journalist, Tokyo bureau chief for The New York Times
- Motoko Sasaki (佐々木 基子; born 1967), Japanese actress and striptease performer

== Fictional characters ==
- Motoko-chan (もと子), the main character of the Super Famicom video game Motoko-chan no Wonder Kitchen
- Motoko Aoyama (素子), a character in the Love Hina series
- Motoko Kusanagi (素子), protagonist of the Ghost in the Shell series
- Motoko Maeda (前田 元子), a character in the Shiki series
- Motoko Minagawa (素子), a character in the Fruits Basket series
