= Muro Miyayama Kofun =

Kofun period keyhole-shaped burial mound in Japan

- 室宮山古墳 (Japanese)
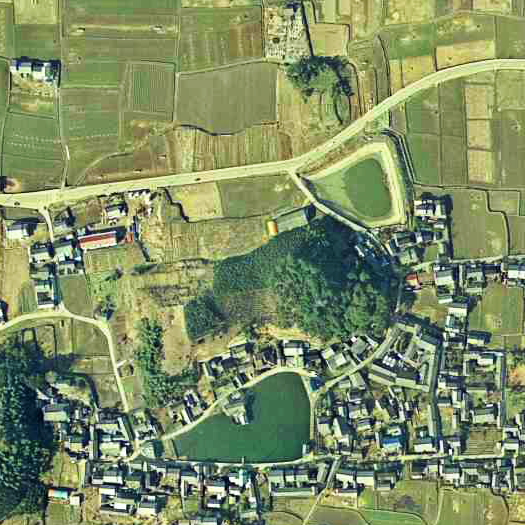
- Muro Miyayama Kofun

- Muro Miyayama Kofun Muro Miyayama Kofun (Japan)
- Interactive map of Muro Miyayama Kofun
- 34°26′34.23″N 135°44′0″E
- Type: Kofun
- Periods: Kofun period
- Location: Gose, Nara, Japan
- Region: Kansai region

History
- Built: c.5th century

Site notes
- Public access: Yes (no facilities)

Muro Miyayama Kofun (室宮山古墳) is a Kofun period burial mound, located in the Muro neighborhood of the town of Gose, Nara in the Kansai region of Japan. The tumulus was designated a National Historic Site of Japan in 1921, with the area under protection expanded in 2022 and again in 2024. The tumulus is also called the Muro-no-Ohaka (室大墓). It is the largest tumulus in the Katsuragi region and the 18th largest in Japan, and is estimated to have been built in the early 5th century.

== Overview ==
Muro Miyayama Kofun is located on the southwestern edge of the Nara Basin. It was built facing west, using the tip of a ridge at the northern foot of the Kose mountain range, in the center of Gose city. It is a large zenpō-kōen-fun (前方後円墳), which is shaped like a keyhole, having one square end and one circular end, when viewed from above, with a total length of 228 meters. The tumulus is orientated to the west-southwest. The mound is constructed in three tiers, the outside of which is covered with fukiishi consisting of broken granite stones, and each tier surrounded by cylindrical and morning glory-shaped haniwa clay figures. The haniwa at the top of the circular portion are figurative haniwa in the form of houses and granaries. A shield-shaped moat surrounds the mound, and a baizuka secondary mound, the Nekozuka Kofun (ネコ塚古墳), is built on the surrounding bank. A Hachiman Shrine has been enshrined on the posterior circular mound since ancient times, hence the name "Miyayama". "Muro" is an ancient place name, and it appears in the Wamyō Ruijushō as "Muro-go" in Katsuragi County, Yamato Province. The posterior circular portion has a diameter of 105 meters and height of 2 meters and the rectangular anterior portion is 110 meters wide and 22 meters high.

Several archaeological excavations have been carried out, revealing that there are an estimated six burial facilities in total, two in the circular posterior portion, part, two in the rectangular anterior portion, and one each in the two the protruding parts. The two burials in the rear mound are vertical-entry stone burial chambers containing a chest-shaped stone coffins, made by cutting and assembling tuff slabs, with the long side stones standing on top of the bottom stone and the short side stones fitted in front and behind, and the inside was painted vermilion. In the southern burial chamber, the chest-shaped stone coffin can be viewed on-site. This long-chest-shaped sarcophagus, also known as the "Great King's Coffin," has a 3.77 meter long lid with eight tortoise-shell decorations on the top, and six rope-hanging protrusions. The grave goods were in pieces due to tomb-robbing, but many items have been excavated, including a triangular-rimmed bronze mirror with divine beasts, armor, iron swords, magatama and tubular beads. A similar sarcophagus was found in the north burial chamber, and boat-shaped pottery was one of the notable grave goods.

The construction of this tumulus is estimated to have been around the beginning of the 5th century, during the middle of the Kofun period, with the tumulus most likely the grave of Katsuragi no Sotsuhiko, who is mentioned in the Kojiki and Nihon Shoki as a military commander of Japanese forces on the Korean Peninsula in the war against the Kingdom of Silla and the ancestor of the Katsuragi clan. His daughter was empress during the time of Emperor Nintoku. There is an alternative theory that this is the tomb of the semi-legendary Emperor Kōan, whose palace (according to the Kojiki) was located in this area.

The tumulus is about 3.3 kilometers south of Kintetsu Gose Station on the Kintetsu Railway Gose Line.

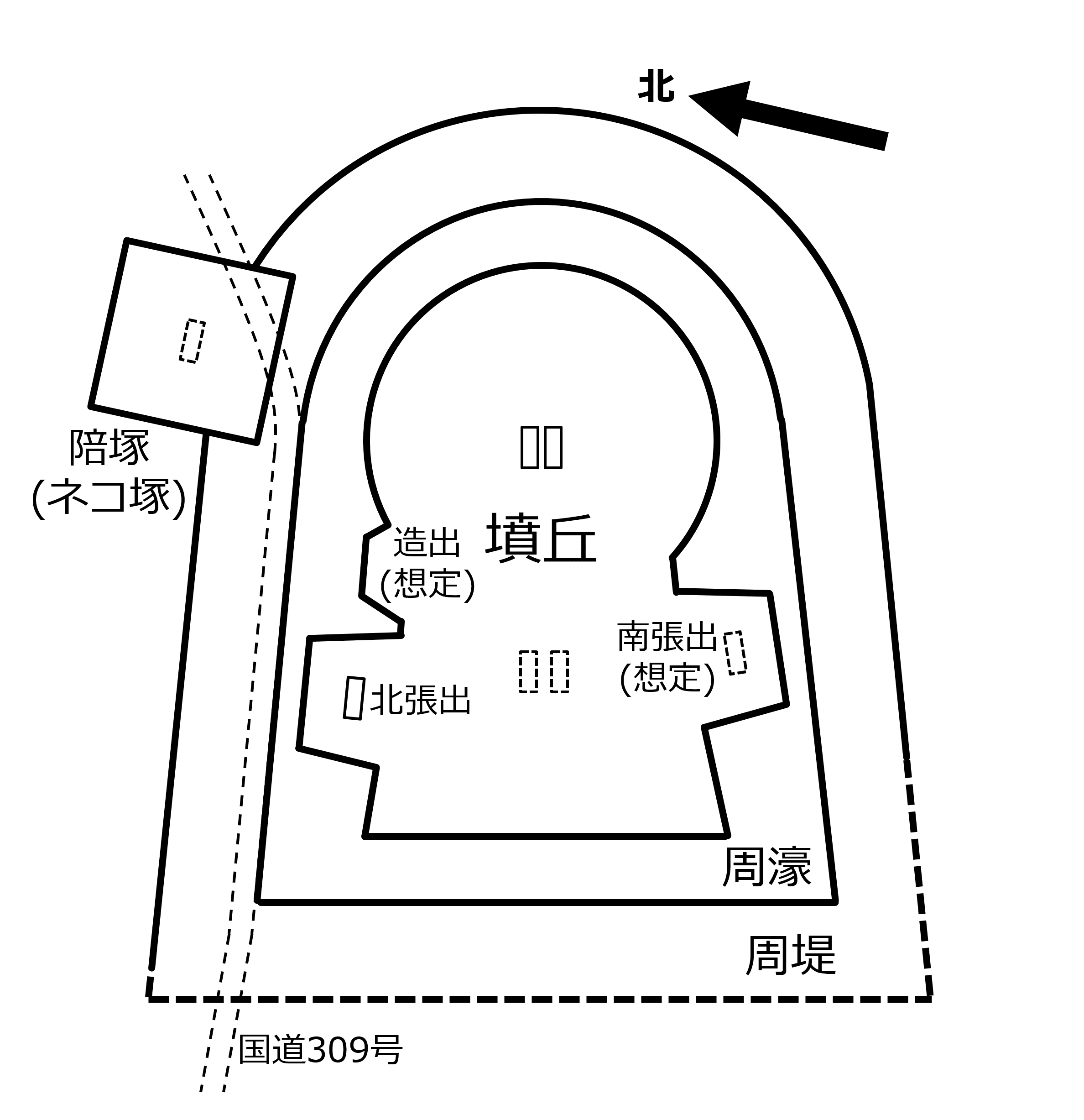
Outline drawing of Muro Miyayama Kofun showing locations of burials

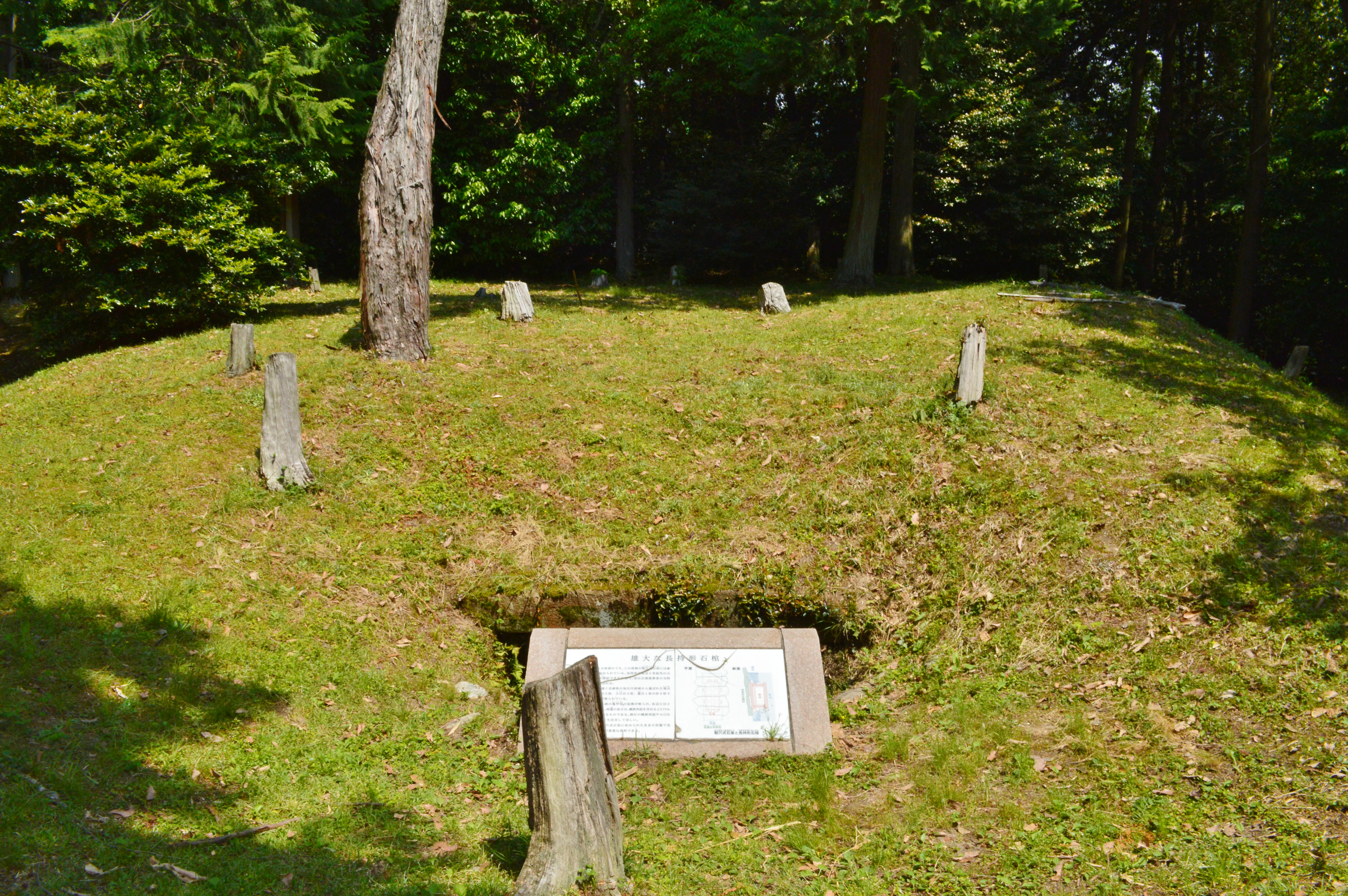
Entrance to south burial chamber in posterior mound

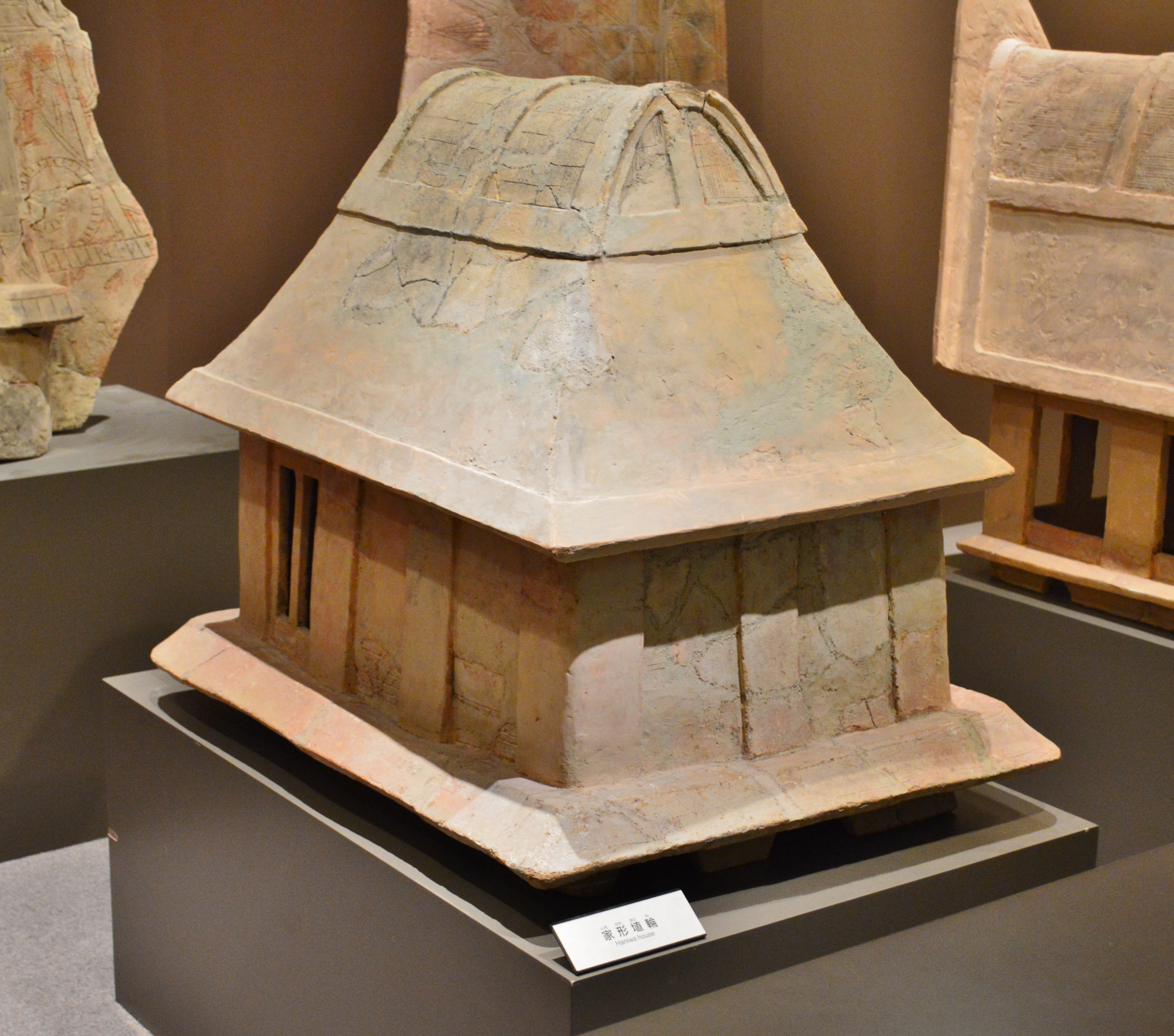
House-shaped haniwa

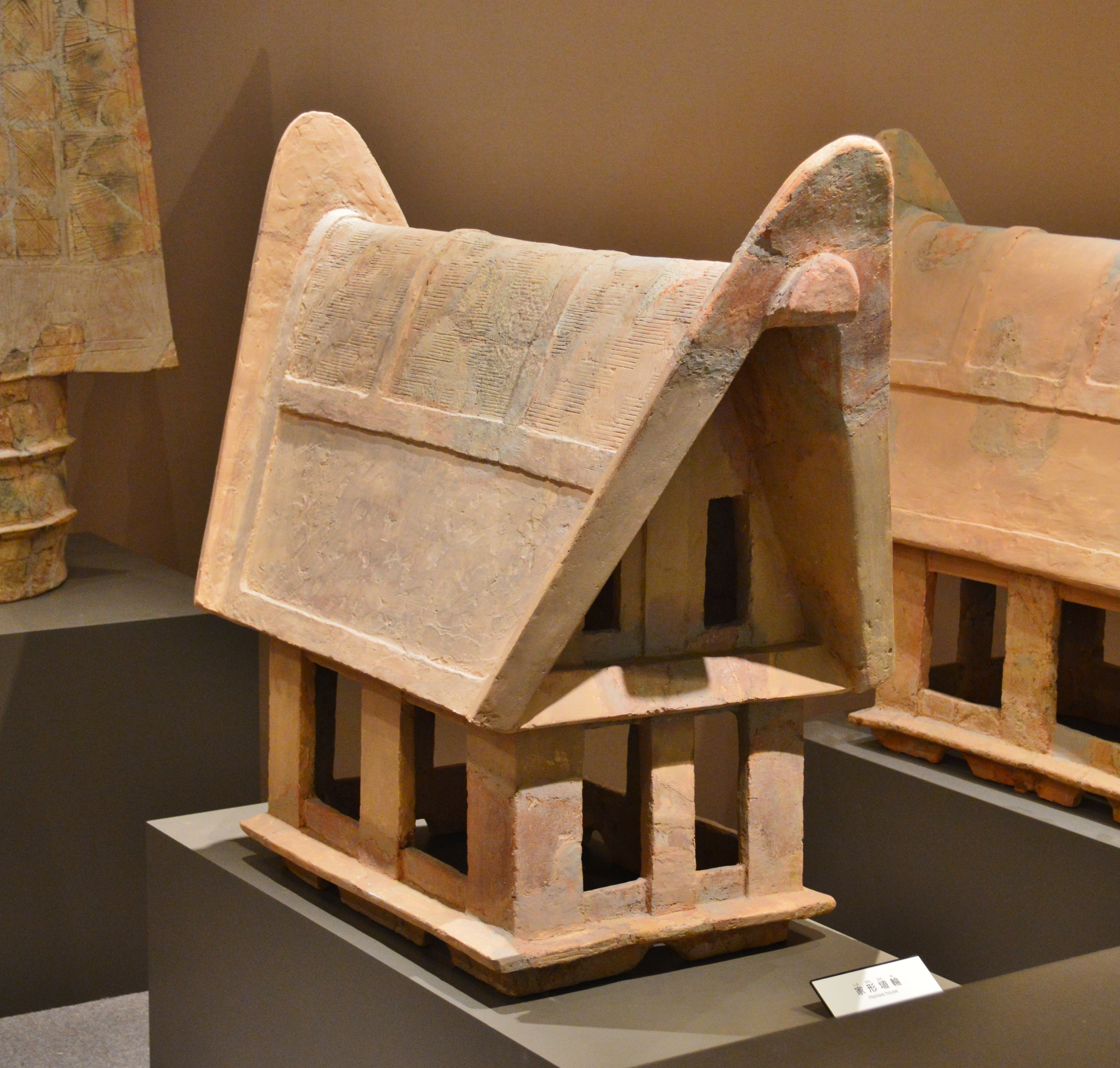
House-shaped haniwa

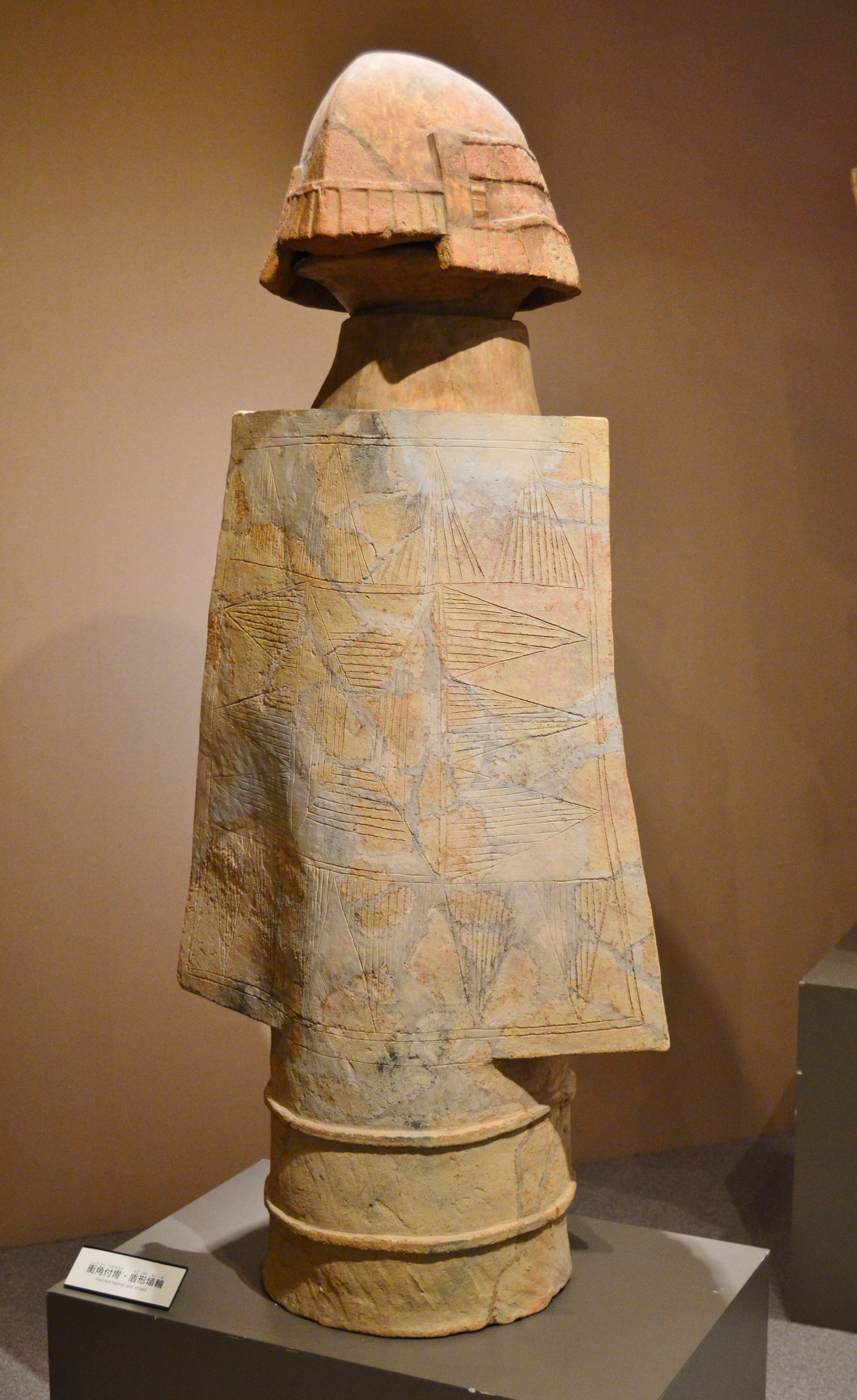
Armor-shaped haniwa

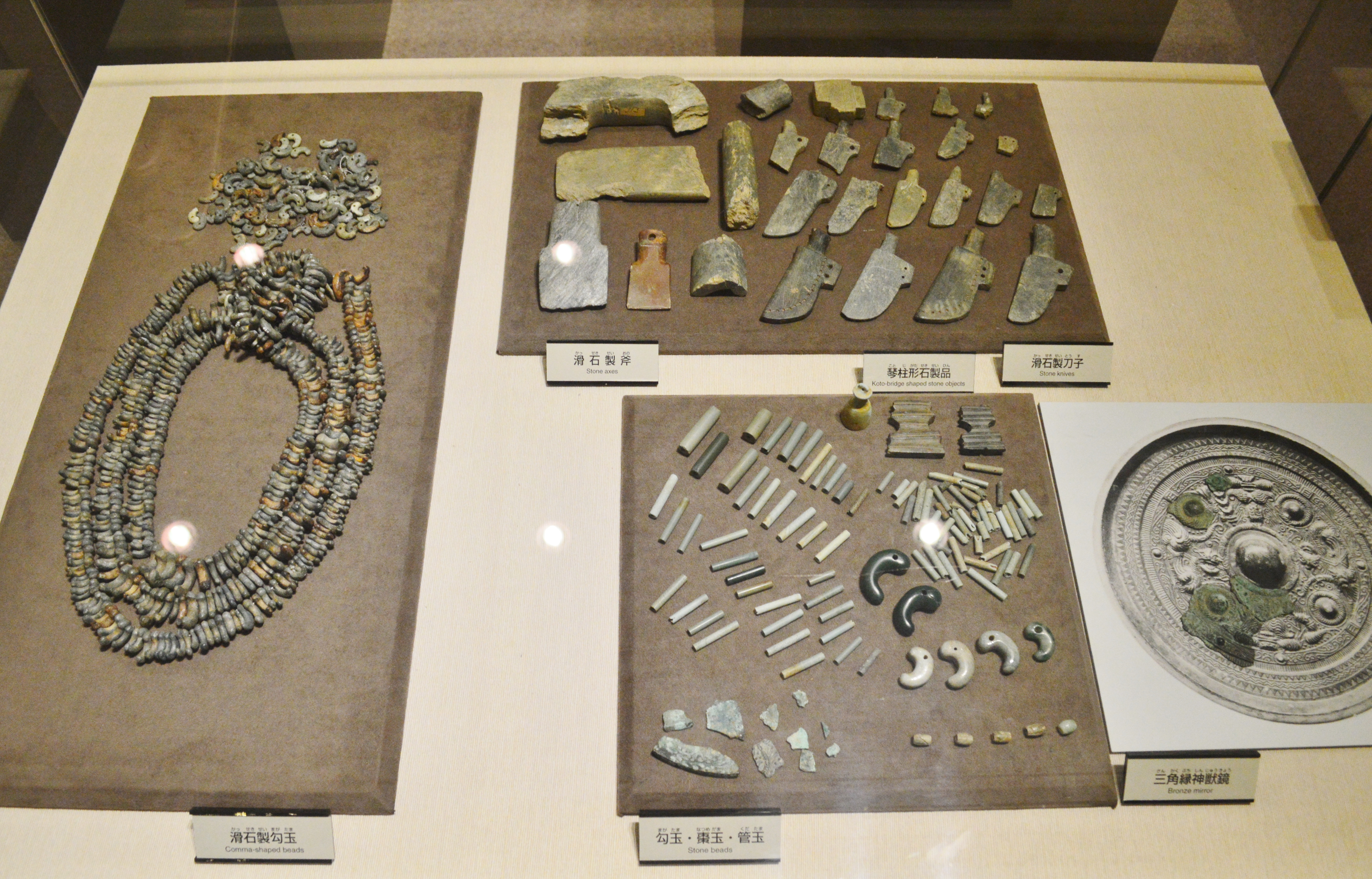
grave goods

== See also ==
- List of Historic Sites of Japan (Nara)
