= Hayao Kawai =

Japanese psychologist (1928–2007)

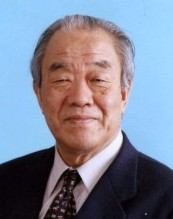
- Born: June 23, 1928; Sasayamacho, Takigun, Hyogo, Japan
- Died: July 19, 2007 (age 79); Tenri, Nara, Japan
- Occupation: Jungian Psychologist

Hayao Kawai (河合隼雄, Kawai Hayao) (1928–2007) was a Japanese Jungian psychologist who has been described as "the founder of Japanese Analytical and Clinical Psychology". He introduced the sandplay therapy concept to Japanese psychology. He participated in Eranos from 1982. Kawai was the director of the International Research Center for Japanese Studies from 1995 to 2001. As chief of the Agency for Cultural Affairs from 2002 to 2007, he oversaw the popular Nihon no Uta Hyakusen song selection, as well as the "Kokoro no Note" ethics textbook now used in all Japanese primary schools. He died in Tenri Hospital following a stroke.

== Published works ==
- The Japanese psyche: major motifs in the fairy tales of Japan (Mukashibanashi to Nihonjin no kokoro) translated by Sachiko Reece, ISBN 0-88214-368-9
- The Buddhist Priest Myōe: A Life of Dreams translated by Mark Unno, ISBN 0-932499-62-7
- Dreams, Myths and Fairy Tales In Japan translated by James G. Donat, ISBN 3-85630-544-0
- Buddhism and the art of psychotherapy, ISBN 1-60344-053-4
- Haruki Murakami Goes to Meet Hayao Kawai, ISBN 978-3-85630-764-6

== Awards ==
- 1982 Kawai received the Osaragi Jiro Prize for his work Japanese Psyche: Major Motifs in the Fairy Tales of Japan.
- 1988 He received the Shincho Gakugei Prize in Learning and the Arts for The Buddhist Priest Myōe: A Life of Dreams.
- 1997 He received the Asahi Prize for groundbreaking research in and clinical practice of psychology
