= Emperor Seinei =

Emperor of Japan from 480 to 484

Emperor Seinei 清寧天皇
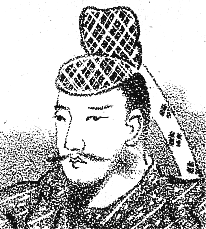

Emperor of Japan
- Reign: 480 – 484 (traditional)
- Predecessor: Yūryaku
- Successor: Princess Iitoyo (de facto) (Note: It is commonly accepted that Princess Iitoyo acted as some type of regent in the interim. (See: "Narrative" for sourcing) She is excluded on the official list of regents as her legitimacy and validity (concerning her reign) is mostly unknown.); Kenzō (traditional)
- Born: Shiraka (白髪); 444 (Note: There is a consensus among sources for this given year.)
- Died: 484 (aged 39–40); Iware no Mikakuri Palace
- Burial: Kawachi no Sakado no hara no misasagi (河内坂門原陵) (Osaka)
Posthumous name
- Chinese-style shigō: Emperor Seinei (清寧天皇) Japanese-style shigō: Shiraka-no-takehiro-kunioshiwaka-yamato-neko no Sumeramikoto (白髪武広国押稚日本根子天皇)
- House: Imperial House of Japan
- Father: Emperor Yūryaku
- Mother: Katsuragi no Karahime

Emperor Seinei (清寧天皇, Seinei-tennō) (444 – 484) was the 22nd (possibly legendary (Note: There is no consensus that Seinei was a historical figure.)) emperor of Japan, according to the traditional order of succession. He is best known for events that took place before and after his reign with a void in between. These include a rebellion which was quickly put down, and a succession crisis as the Emperor had no children. Because Seinei had such a low profile, historians have questioned his existence and whether he ever ascended to the throne.

No firm dates can be assigned to this emperor's life or reign, but he is conventionally considered to have reigned from 480 to 484. Dates confirmed as "traditional" did not appear until the reign of Emperor Kanmu (the 50th emperor). Modern historians have come to the conclusion that the title of "Emperor" and the name "Seinei" were used by later generations to describe him.

== Narrative ==
The Japanese have traditionally accepted this sovereign's historical existence, and a mausoleum (misasagi) for Seinei is currently maintained. The following information available is taken from the pseudo-historical Kojiki and Nihon Shoki, which are collectively known as Kiki (記紀) or Japanese chronicles. These chronicles include legends and myths, as well as potential historical facts that have since been exaggerated and/or distorted over time. It is recorded in the Nihon Shoki (Note: The Kojiki only records information related to searching for a successor to Emperor Seinei.) that Seinei was born to Katsuragi no Karahime (葛城韓媛) sometime in 444 AD, and was given the name Shiraka (白髪皇子). Prince Shiraka was the third and favorite son of Emperor Yūryaku, and was made heir apparent a year before his father's death. Yūryaku had taken notice at how Shiraka was born with white hair as meaning something significant.

During the transition period, Yūryaku's other consort Kibi no Wakahime (吉備稚媛) convinced her younger son Prince Hoshikawa to assert his claim to the throne. While Hoshikawa was Prince Shiraka's older brother, the eldest sibling in the household (Prince Iwaki (磐城皇子)) advised against it. In the rebellion that followed Hoshikawa and his followers sieged the Imperial treasury. They were then surrounded by court troops who burned the building to the ground, roasting to death all but one surviving minor official (who was given mercy). With the rebellion put down, Prince Shiraka assumed the throne as Emperor Seinei in 480 AD. Although the Emperor appointed a woman named Katsuraki Kara-hime as "Grand Consort", she was never made an Empress.

Seinei grew distressed in the second year of his reign as he had no children to succeed him. His father Emperor Yūryaku had done away with all of his male relations in his obsessive conquest for the throne, his older brother Prince Hoshikawa had been burnt to death, and Prince Iwaki died sometime in 481 AD. Seinei lucked out when two grandsons (Woke and Oke) of Emperor Richū were discovered by chance while the governor of Harima was out for an inspection. The two princes had fled to the countryside after their father, Ichinobe no Oshiwa was killed by Emperor Yūryaku. These events regarding succession were also later recorded in the Kojiki.

When word got to the Emperor about the two Princes, he was delighted and formerly adopted them as his heirs. Sometime in 482 AD, Prince Oke was appointed as Crown Prince. Seinei's death sometime in 484 AD (possibly January) came with a problem as his two adopted sons were very courteous towards each other. Although Prince Oke had been appointed heir, he ceded the throne to his brother Prince Woke, who in turn ceded it back. The two debated the issue for about a year while Princess Iitoyo, a daughter of Emperor Richū was allegedly made regent. Her death in late 484 AD resolved the debate and Prince Woke ascended to the throne as Emperor Kenzō in the following year.

== Historical assessment ==
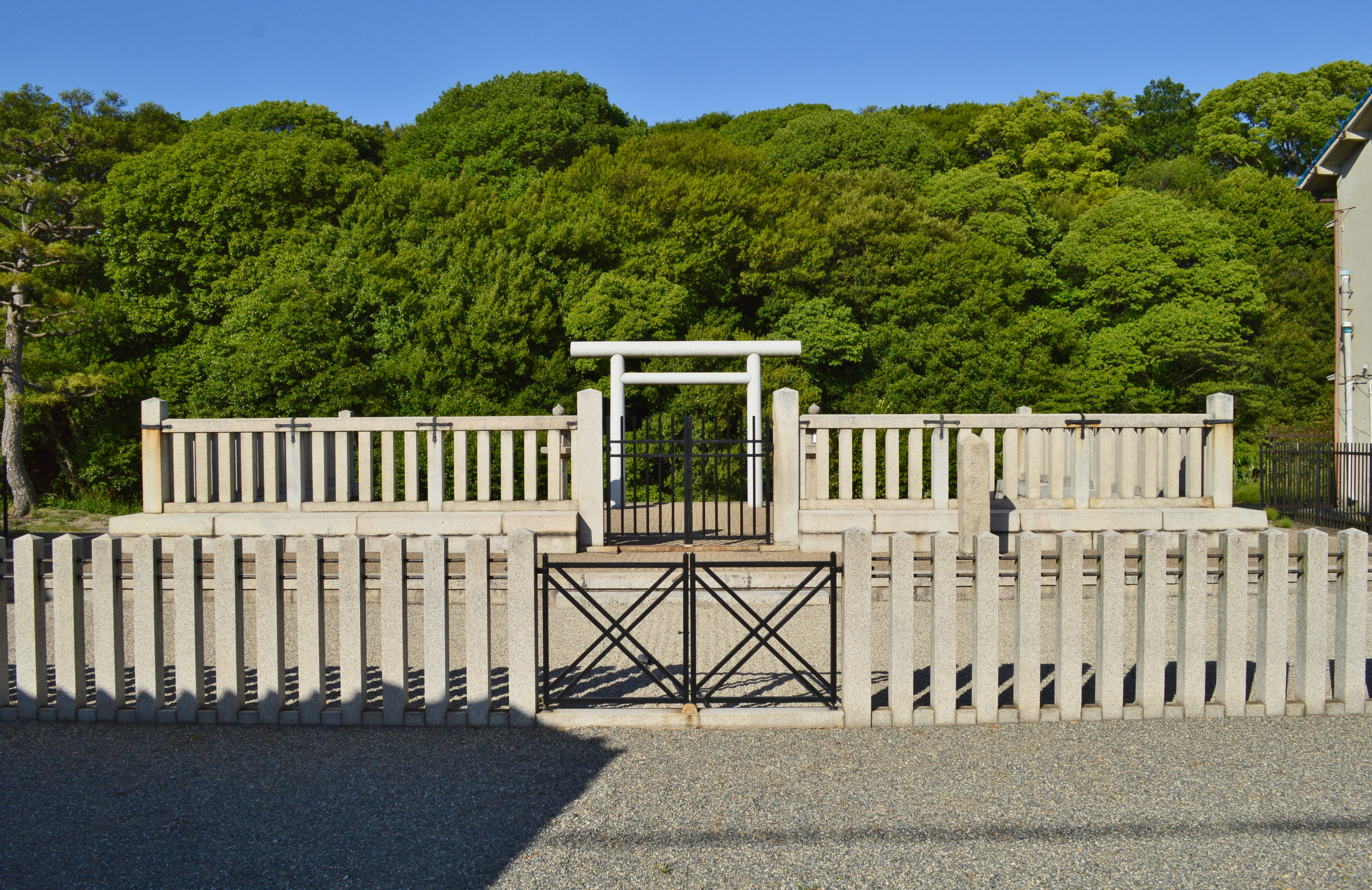
Emperor Seinei's Mausoleum in Habikino

The actual existence of Emperor Seinei is debated among historians due to a lack of available information. British academic and author Richard Ponsonby-Fane notes that the Kojiki gives no details about Seinei and some lists omit his name altogether. Scholar Francis Brinkley though, still lists Emperor Seinei under "Protohistoric sovereigns". He mentioned there that Emperor Yūryaku's "evil act" of stealing Tasa's wife (Kibi no Wakahime) led to serious consequences. While Wakahime and her companions conspired to place her own son on the throne, Brinkley stated that they underestimated the power of the Katsuragi family. (Note: Emperor Seinei's mother belonged to this family.) In regard to the Emperor's hair, Dutch historian and Japanologist Isaac Titsingh mentioned that "there is speculation that this [Seisei's] unusual hair color suggests albinism.

There is no evidence to suggest that the title tennō (meaning "emperor") was used during the time to which Seinei's reign has been assigned. Instead, his title could have possibly been Sumeramikoto or Amenoshita Shiroshimesu Ōkimi (治天下大王), meaning "the great king who rules all under heaven", or ヤマト大王/大君 "Great King of Yamato". The name Seinei-tennō was more than likely assigned to him posthumously by later generations. His name might have been regularized centuries after the lifetime ascribed to Seinei, possibly during the time in which legends about the origins of the imperial dynasty were compiled as the chronicles known today as the Kojiki.

Outside of the Kiki, the reign of Emperor Kinmei (Note: The 29th Emperor) (c. 509 – 571 AD) is the first for which contemporary historiography has been able to assign verifiable dates. The conventionally accepted names and dates of the early Emperors were not confirmed as "traditional" though, until the reign of Emperor Kanmu (Note: Kanmu was the 50th sovereign of the imperial dynasty) between 737 and 806 AD.

While the actual site of Seinei's grave is not known, this regent is traditionally venerated at a kofun-type Imperial tomb in Habikino, Osaka. The Imperial Household Agency designates this location as Seinei's mausoleum and is formally named Kawachi no Sakado no hara no misasagi. (河内坂門原陵). Seinei is also enshrined at the Tokyo Imperial Palace in the Three Palace Sanctuaries.

== See also ==
- List of emperors of Japan
- Imperial cult

== Notes ==
Regnal titles
Preceded by Emperor Yūryaku	Emperor of Japan: Seinei; 480 – 484 (traditional dates)	Succeeded by Emperor Kenzō
