= Makoto Satō =

Makoto Satō may refer to:

- Makoto Satō (actor) (佐藤 允, 1934–2012), Japanese actor
- Makoto Satō (theatre) (佐藤 信, born 1943), Japanese theater director and playwright
- Makoto Satō (director) (佐藤 真, 1957–2007), Japanese film director
- Makoto Satō (baseball) (佐藤 誠, born 1975), player for the Fukuoka SoftBank Hawks
