= Gukanshō =

11th-century Japanese literary work

Gukanshō (愚管抄; lit. "Jottings of a Fool") is a historical and literary work about the history of Japan. Seven volumes in length, it was composed by Buddhist priest Jien of the Tendai sect around 1220.

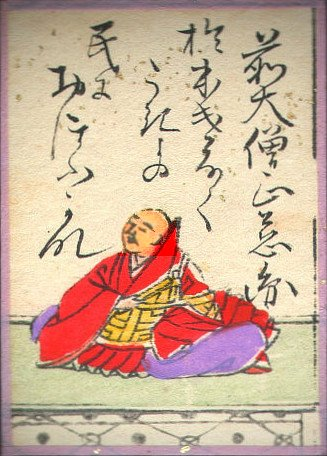
Jien, the author of Gukanshō (as rendered in a portrait found in the Ogura Hyakunin Isshu)

Political problems arising from the relations between the Imperial government and the bakufu inspired Jien to write. Jien was the son of Fujiwara no Tadamichi, and his insider's perspective ensured that his work would have a distinct point of view. Rather than working towards an absence of bias, he embraced it; and Gukanshō is fairly described as a work of historical argument. The writer does try to approach Japan's past in a new way, but he does so under the influences of old historical and genealogical interests.

== Contents ==
The text is composed of three major sections:

1. Volumes 1 and 2 consist of imperial chronicle beginning with Emperor Jimmu and concluding with Emperor Juntoku.
2. Volumes 3 through 6 present a historical description focusing on political transitions.
3. Volume 7 offers a summary of the contemporary state of the Japanese polity.

The careful writer attempted to apply Buddhist principles such as mappō to the process of developing a chronicle of people and events. He was also self-consciously focused on the application of Buddhist principles in the analysis of Japanese history. However, Jien could never completely divorce his position as a son and brother of Fujiwara Regents officials from his position as a priest who studied and practiced Buddhism.

== See also ==
- Historiographical Institute of the University of Tokyo
- International Research Center for Japanese Studies
- Japanese Historical Text Initiative
- Historiography of Japan
