= Makoto Sasaki =

Makoto Sasaki may refer to the following:

- Makoto Sasaki (baseball) (佐々木 誠, born 1965)
- Makoto Sasaki (shogi) (佐々木 慎, born 1980)
