= Makoto Ueda =

Makoto Ueda may refer to:

- Makoto Ueda (poetry critic) (上田 真, 1931–2020), writer on Japanese poetry
- Makoto Ueda (architecture critic) (植田 実, born 1935), writer on collective housing
