= University of Tokyo Press =

- Parent company: University of Tokyo
- Founded: 1951
- Country of origin: Japan
- Headquarters location: Tokyo
- Distribution: Columbia University Press (US)
- Publication types: Books
- Official website: www.utp.or.jp

The University of Tokyo Press (東京大学出版会, Tōkyō Daigaku Shuppan-kai) is a university press affiliated with the University of Tokyo in Japan. It was founded in 1951, following the post-World War II reorganization of the university.

The press is currently a member of the Association of University Presses.

== Honors ==
- Japan Foundation: Special Prize, 1990.

== Location ==
The headquarters of the University of Tokyo Press is located on the main campus of the University of Tokyo, at 7-3-1 Hongō, Bunkyō, Tokyo.
