= International Research Center for Japanese Studies =

Inter-university research institute in Kyoto, Japan

Coordinates: 34°59′17″N 135°40′01″E

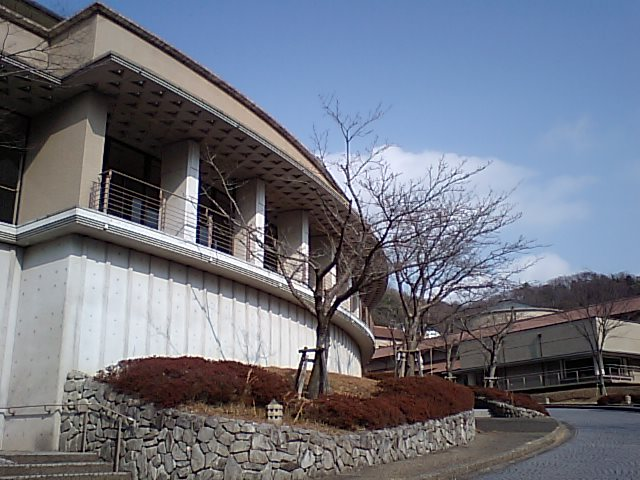
Building of Nichibunken

The International Research Center for Japanese Studies (国際日本文化研究センター, Kokusai Nihon Bunka Kenkyū Sentā), or Nichibunken (日文研), is an inter-university research institute in Kyoto. Along with the National Institute of Japanese Literature, the National Museum of Japanese History, and the National Museum of Ethnology, it is one of the National Institutes for the Humanities. The center is devoted to research related to Japanese culture.

== History ==
The official origins of the institute are traced to an early study carried out by the Japanese Ministry of Education, Science, and Culture in 1982 on "methods of comprehensive research on Japanese culture". After surveying the field of Japanese studies for several years, the ministry, under the administration of Prime Minister Nakasone Yasuhiro, established the International Research Center for Japanese Studies in 1987 in Kyoto with the prominent philosopher Umehara Takeshi as its first Director-General. Prominent Kyoto academics Umesao Nobuo and Kuwabara Takeo also played key roles in the founding of the center.

In 1990 the center moved to its current site in Oeyama-chō, Nishikyō-ku. In 1995 Kawai Hayao, a Jungian analyst of Japanese psychology and religion, was inaugurated as the second director-general of Nichibunken. In 2001, Yamaori Tetsuo, professor of Japanese religion and folklore, became the center's third director-general. In 2005, Katakura Motoko became the fourth director of the Nichibunken. She was the first woman and the first non-specialist in Japanese studies to hold the position. Her academic background was in Middle Eastern studies, and she was a cultural anthropologist by training. In 2020, Shoichi Inoue was appointed as the seventh director of the Nichibunken. He is a specialist in the social and cultural history of everyday life in Japan.

== The Nichibunken Library ==
A library of Japanese Studies is attached to the center. The collection primarily consists of books and bibliographic materials pertinent to the academic study of Japan. As of 2014, the library contains approximately 400,000 volumes of books in Japanese and 97,000 volumes in other languages. It also houses approximately 4,400 Japanese periodicals and about 1,000 foreign language periodicals. The library has also a significant storage of media materials in form of records, video and other digital forms.

== Publications ==
Nichibunken publishes two periodicals in the field of Japanese studies: Japan Review in English and Nihon Kenkyū (in Japanese). Japan Review is a peer-reviewed journal available on JSTOR and on the Nichibunken website. Japan Review, which is published annually, accepts outstanding essays on Japanese culture from scholars across the globe, as well as research notes. It carries reviews of important books on Japanese studies. Japan Review also publishes Special Issues, the first of which was published in 2013 as "Shunga: Sex and Humor in Japanese Art and Literature." The bi-annual Nihon Kenkyū is also peer reviewed and invites contributions from scholars everywhere.

== Databases ==
The following databases are accessible from the Nichibunken webpage. Some of the databases require you to register and obtain a password.

- Rare Books

This is a database of images of all rare books in Nichibunken's collection. It primarily consists of books treating Japan in Western languages published before the opening of the country to foreign commerce in the 1850s. In addition to graphic images of all pages of these rare books, the database contains searchable text with bibliographic information, tables of contents of the books, and captions of the illustrations in the books.

- Catalogue of the pre-1900 printed books on Japan in European languages housed in the library of Nichibunken

This online catalogue is a database of the bibliographical details of pre-1900 European books housed in Nichibunken's library which contain references to Japan. A total of 1,057 items are listed here

- Foreign Images of Japan

Nichibunken's collection of 51,805 photographs, illustrations, and other visual images of Japan or Japan-related subjects from around the world. Users must register with Nichibunken in order to view the photos in this database.

- Early Photographs

5,431 hand-colored photographs of Japan and accompanying text dating from the end of the Edo Period through the beginning of the Meiji Period. This database also requires users to register with Nichibunken.

- Japanese Art in Overseas Collections

Images and textual information on Japanese art in foreign collections. The collection includes paintings, prints, ceramics, and lacquerware. Registration required.

- Heian jinbutsushi Information

The Heian jinbutsushi is a Who's Who of Kyoto in the Edo period. It brings together information on literati and connoisseurs of various arts from all parts of the city and its environs. The first edition appeared in 1768 and the ninth and last edition in 1867. Between those dates, revised and expanded editions of the directory were published approximately once a decade, in 1775, 1783, 1813, 1822, 1830, 1838, and 1852. This database is constructed on the basis of original works that are all in Nichibunken's collection.

- Heian jinbutsushi tanzaku Information

The Heian jinbutsushi tanzakuchō is a collection of rectangular cards (tanzaku) on which poems were written by persons whose names appear in the Heian jinbutsushi. The originals are holograph brush-written poems. This database is constructed on the basis of tanzaku that are all in Nichibunken's collection. For some poems in the database (those originally written in Chinese, or kanshi), annotated English translations are included.

- SODA Collection: Pictorial and Miscellaneous Materials, Rare Books

The SODA Collection, originally the collection of the medical historian Soda Hajime, contains books and prints related to the history of medicine. The major portion of digitized resources here is pictorial.

- Miyako nenjū gyōji gajō

The Miyako nenjū gyōji gajō is a two-volume album of hand painted pictures on silk by Nakajima Sōyō. It depicts the annual festivals and customs of Kyoto at the beginning of the Showa period. These paintings are accompanied by explanatory texts written by the folklorist and Kyoto scholar Ema Tsutomu.

- Space in Historical Perspective

This is a collection of historical map images. It is not possible to zoom into these maps unless you are connected to the Nichibunken Intranet.

- Zuroku Bei-Ō kairan jikki

The Zuroku Bei-Ō kairan jikki (translated as "The illustrated true account of the observations of the ambassadors plenipotentiary of America and Europe") is a collection of illustrations and descriptive passages related to the Iwakura Mission. It was published in 1878.

- Kinsei kijinden

This contains the digitized full text and prints of the Kinsei kijinden, a collection of biographies of eccentrics from the Edo period.

- Illustrations of Historic Places in Kyoto

This contains digitized images of Edo-era and Meiji-era guidebooks to historic sites in Kyoto.

- Folk tale Data of Strange Phenomena and Yōkai

This database contains bibliographic information related to folklore research in Japan.

- Old Maps of Nagasaki

A database of 221 color photographic images of historical maps from the Nagasaki Municipal Museum's collection. Registration is required.

- Mysterious Stories of Kannon Bodhisattva in Ukiyoe

A database of illustrations from the Kannon reigenki, a collection of legends pertaining to the Kannon Bodhisattva.

== See also ==
- Historiography of Japan
