= Jien =

Japanese poet

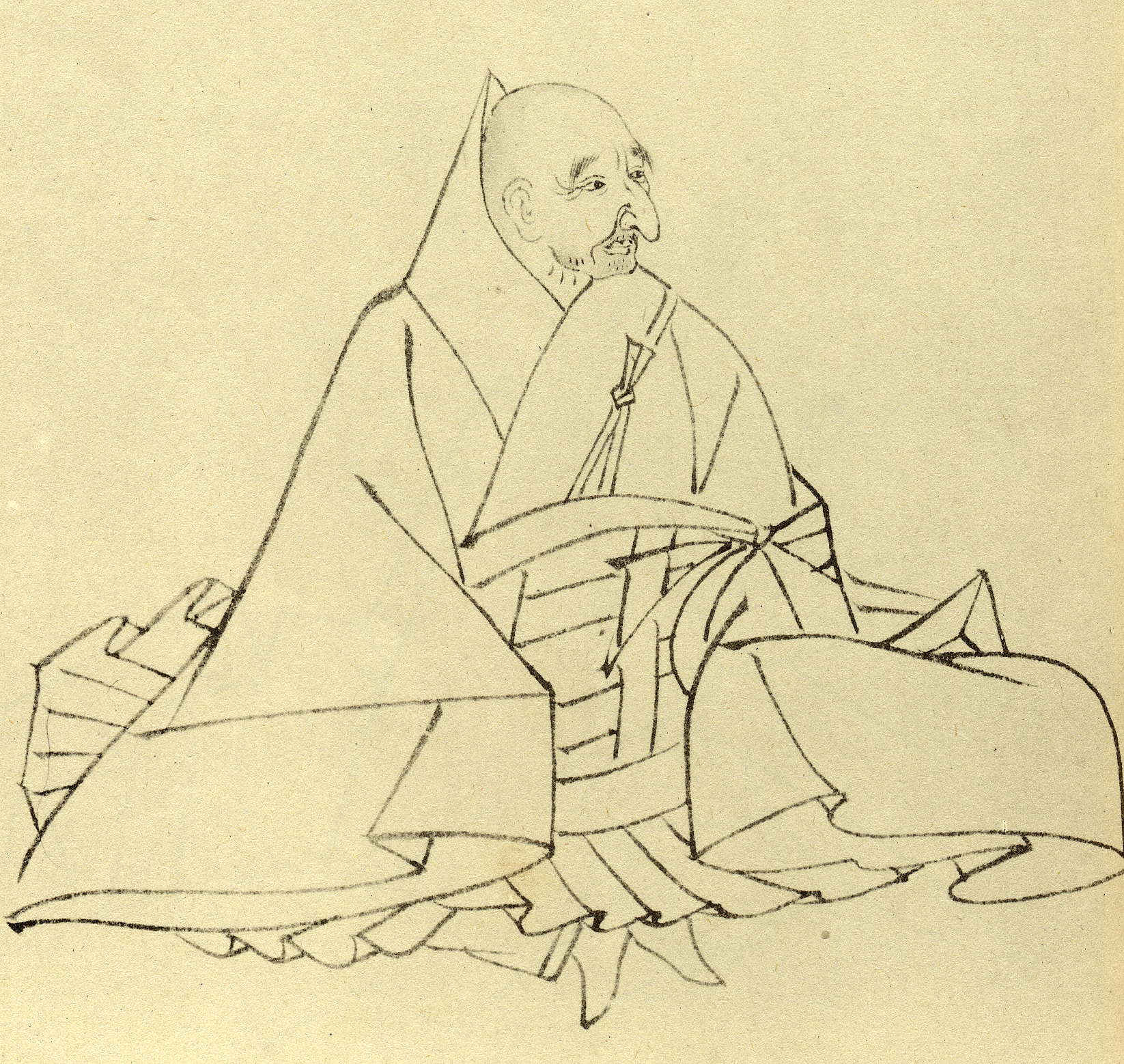
- Born: 17 May 1155; Heian-kyō
- Died: 28 October 1225 (aged 70); Omi (now Shiga)
- Occupation: Buddhist monk
- Writing career
- Genres: history, poetry
- Subject: Japanese history

Jien (慈円; 17 May 1155 in Kyoto – 28 October 1225 in Omi) was a Japanese poet, historian, and Buddhist monk.

== Biography ==
Jien was the son of Fujiwara no Tadamichi, a member of the Fujiwara clan of powerful aristocrats. His brother was the future regent Fujiwara no Kanezane. Jien became a Tendai monk early in his life, entering Shōren-in at age eleven. He first took the Buddhist name Dokaei, and later changed it to Jien.

In 1192, with the recommendation of Minamoto no Yoritomo and Jien's elder brother Fujiwara no Kanezane, at the age of 38, Jien became the Daisōjō (大僧正), leader of the Tendai. However, his position was not stable as shown by the fact that he was appointed as Daisōjō four times back and forth following his brother Kanezane's ups and downs in the political world. This is because as the leader of Tendai, in addition to holding rituals and maintaining Buddhist monasteries, he also served politically as the guardian of Kujō Michiie, the grandson of his brother Kanezane. Jien put hopes on Michiie's son, Kujō Yoritsune, to become the shogun of the Kamakura Shogunate.

Jien eventually began to study and write Japanese history, his purpose being to "enlighten people who find it hard to understand the vicissitudes of life". His masterpiece, completed around 1220, was humbly entitled Gukanshō, which translates as Jottings of a Fool. In it he tried to analyze the facts of Japanese history. The Gukanshō held a mappo and therefore pessimistic view of his age, the Feudal Period, and claimed that it was a period of religious decline and saw the disintegration of civilization. This is the viewpoint generally held today. Jien claimed that changes in the feudal structure were necessary and defended the shōgun's claim of power.

== Gukanshō ==
When Emperor Go-Toba attempted to overthrow the Shogunate, Jien, fearing that the Kujō family would be affected, began to trace the history of Japan and wrote Gukanshō, a combination of History, Buddhist ideas and legends, to try to dissuade emperor Go-Toba from overthrow the Shogunate. In Gukanshō he also try to associates his grandnewphew Kujō Yoritsune with the bodhisattva and other legends which is able to gain legitimacy for Yoritsune and to reach the position of shogun:"The coming of such a Shogun is the plan of the Great Bodhisattva, a man(Kujō Yoritsune) who can protect the world and defend the sovereign, with both literary and military prowess and dignity. This is a matter of great importance."（かかる将軍のかく出で来る事は大菩薩の御計らひにて、文武兼じて威勢ありて世を守り君を守るべき摂籙の人（=道家と頼経）をまうけて、世の為人の為君の御為に参らせらるるをば、君のえ御心得御座（おは）しまさぬにこそ。これこそ由々しき大事にて侍れ）

Jien writes several times in Gukanshō that he wants "to make Dōri known," which is an important motivation for Jien to write Gukanshō. Dōri(reason) is an early Chinese philosophical idea(道理) that was later absorbed into Buddhism. Generally it means reason, principle or law, or what action one should take to be moral. Jien, on the other hand, historicizes Dōri, arguing that it has been present throughout the development and change of Japanese history. That is to say, historical events, both in their particularity and in their totality, are to be taken extremely seriously, not merely as isolated, individual events, but as part of an unfolding pattern of deeper meaning. An important element of this is embodied in the unbroken imperial lineage of Japan. however, when there is a choice, between two members of the imperial family, one evil and one virtuous, Jien affirms that even murder is permissible to prevent the throne from falling into the hands of an evil emperor. Overall, he wanted to help people, especially the Emperor, to come to understand Dori through Japanese history so that he could shape a desirable future and help the country go through mappo.

== Poetry ==
As a poet, he was named one of the Thirty-Six Immortals of Poetry, and was the second-best represented poet in the Shin Kokin Wakashū, over 91 of his poems are collected into it. He has a family Japanese poem collection called 拾玉集 with over 5900 poems. He was included by Fujiwara no Teika in the Ogura Hyakunin Isshu.

In The Unfettered Mind the Zen Buddhist Takuan Sōhō cites the following poem from Jien, interpreting it in the context of No-Mind:

The flower that would surrender its fragrance

before my brushwood door

Does so regardless.

I, however, sit and stare

How rueful this world.

== See also ==
- Kankyo no Tomo, a collection of setsuwa formerly attributed to Jien

== Bibliography ==
- Brown, Delmer and Ichiro Ishida, eds. (1979). [Jien (1221)], Gukanshō; "The Future and the Past: a translation and study of the 'Gukanshō', an interpretive history of Japan written in 1219" translated from the Japanese and edited by Delmer M. Brown & Ichirō Ishida. Berkeley: University of California Press. ISBN 0-520-03460-0
- Encyclopædia Britannica 2005 Ultimate Reference Suite DVD, article "Jien"
- Mostow, Joshua S., (1996) Pictures of the Heart: The Hyakunin Isshu in Word and Image, pp. 421–422
- Robert, Jean-Noël (2008). La Centurie du Lotus: Poèmes de Jien (1155–1225) sur le Sûtra du Lotus; Paris: Collège de France, Institut des hautes études japonaises. ISBN 9782913217195
- Swanson, Eric Haruki. (2019). The Restoration of Peace Through the Pacification of Vengeful Spirits: Jien (1155-1225) and the Construction of Buddhist Orthodoxy. Doctoral dissertation, Harvard University, Graduate School of Arts & Sciences. http://nrs.harvard.edu/urn-3:HUL.InstRepos:42029681
