= National Institute of Japanese Literature =

Coordinates: 35°42′45″N 139°24′32″E

The National Institute of Japanese Literature (国文学研究資料館, Kokubungaku Kenkyū Shiryōkan), or NIJL, was established in May 1972. Its primary purpose is to preserve manuscripts and books relating to the study of Japanese literature. Original texts and microfilms of these originals are stored in the institute's archives, although a project is underway to make digital copies of all these materials. The NIJL provides several useful tools for the scholar of Japanese literature, including a compilation of research published yearly in the journal Kokubungaku Nenkan (国文学年刊). It has also developed several on-line databases.

== History of the Institute ==
In 1966, the Convention of Japanese Scholarship advised the government of Japan to found what at the time was referred to as 'Center for Japanese studies and Japanese Literature'. Appropriations were approved by the Ministry of Education in 1970, and the National Institute of Japanese Literature was built in 1972. The Ministry of Education Historical Archives which already existed at the site were incorporated into the Institution. In 1987, a microfilm and electronic database search system was made available. In 1992, Japanese Literature Essay Online Database was first created, the institute is continually working to expand these databases.

== Research and publications ==
The NIJL's primary purposes are to perform and publish research on Japanese literature. Its research is divided into four main areas of interest: (1) research on original copies of Japanese literary materials; (2) research on the creation, reception and expression of Japanese literature; (3) interdisciplinary research linking Japanese literary studies to other disciplines in order to introduce new ideas and techniques into Japanese scholarship; and (4) research on archiving and preservation of historical documents.

The NIJL also is in the process of creating electronic archives of historical documents. It runs a graduate research facility called "The Graduate University for Advanced Studies." It publishes several series of scholarly journals, copies of its microfilm archives, and many multi-volume compendiums of historical and contemporary Japanese literature, such as the Nihon koten bungaku taikei or NKBT. It also gathers historical documents from all over Japan to make microfilm and digital copies to add to its archives.

== The Digital Library ==
The NIJL's Online Databases, though not a complete set of its archived materials, are constantly expanding. Several of these are open to the public, others (particularly the full-text databases such as the Nihon koten bungaku taikei) are only available to scholars who must apply through the NIJL website for a username and password. The NIJL's webpages and databases are in Japanese, they do not have mirror sites in English or other foreign languages. Full-text databases can be used to search for specific words and passages in historical works of literature, however they are not suitable for reading large sections of text.

databases:

- Nara ehon database (image)
- Nihon koten bungaku taikei database(full-text)
- Kokusho kihon database (catalogue)
- Bunken chōsa kādo database (catalogue)
- Kindai bunken databases
  - Kindai bunken gazō database (image)
  - Kindai shoshi database (catalogue)
  - Meijiki shuppan kōkoku database(full-text)
  - Kokusho zasshisho mokuroku OPAC database(catalogue)
- Maikuro shiryū wakosho mokuroku database (catalogue)
- Oushū shozai nihon kosho sōgō mokuroku Union Catalogue of Early Japanese Books in Europe (catalogue)
- Nijyūichi daishû database (full-text)
- Kokubungaku ronbun mokuroku database (catalogue)
- Shiryōkan shūzô shiryō database
- Shiryōsho zaijōhō kensaku sisutemu database
- Shiryō jōhō kyōyūka database
- Renga database (unavailable)
- En'nō database (unavailable)
