= List of World Heritage Sites in Eastern Asia =

The UNESCO (United Nations Educational, Scientific and Cultural Organization) has designated 99 World Heritage Sites in five countries (also called "state parties") of East Asia: China, Mongolia, North Korea, South Korea and Japan.

In this region, China is home to the most inscribed sites with number of 60. The first sites from the region (and only sites designated in the 1980s or before) were the Great Wall of China, Mount Tai, the Peking Man Site at Zhoukoudian, Imperial Palace of the Ming and Qing Dynasties, the Mogao Caves and the Mausoleum of the First Qin Emperor, and all of them were in China. Each year, UNESCO's World Heritage Committee may inscribe new sites on the list, or delist sites that no longer meet the criteria. Selection is based on ten criteria: six for cultural heritage (i–vi) and four for natural heritage (vii–x). Some sites, designated "mixed sites," represent both cultural and natural heritage. In Eastern Asia, there are 74 cultural, 21 natural, and four mixed sites.

The World Heritage Committee may also specify that a site is endangered, citing "conditions which threaten the very characteristics for which a property was inscribed on the World Heritage List." In this region there are no sites currently listed as endangered, nor have any been listed previously. Possible danger listing has been considered by UNESCO in a number of other cases.

Although a number of sites in Taiwan have been proposed, interference from the People's Republic of China has prevented any site on the island from being listed.

== Legend ==
Site; named after the World Heritage Committee's official designation
Location; at city, regional, or provincial level and geocoordinates
Criteria; as defined by the World Heritage Committee
Area; in hectares and acres. If available, the size of the buffer zone has been noted as well. A value of zero implies that no data has been published by UNESCO
Year; during which the site was inscribed to the World Heritage List
Description; brief information about the site, including reasons for qualifying as an endangered site, if applicable

== World Heritage Sites ==
* Trans-border site

Site	Image	Location	Criteria	Area ha (acre)	Year	Description	Refs
Amami-Ōshima Island, Tokunoshima Island, Northern part of Okinawa Island, and Iriomote Island		Kagoshima Prefecture, Japan; 28°16′45″N 129°22′42″E	Natural: (x)	42,698 (105,510); buffer zone 24,467 (60,460)	2021		
Ancient Building Complex in the Wudang Mountains	A complex of interconnected traditional houses with tile roofs and red walls.	Danjiangkou, Hubei, China; 32°28′0″N 111°0′0″E	Cultural: (i)(ii)(vi)	—	1994		
Ancient Capitals of Asuka and Fujiwara		Nara Prefecture, Japan; 34°28′24″N 135°49′16″E	Cultural: (ii)(iii)	138 (340); buffer zone 1,128 (2,790)	2026		
Ancient City of Ping Yao	A street lined by traditional houses with red lampions leading to a multi-storied gate.	Pingyao County, Shanxi, China; 37°12′5″N 112°9′16″E	Cultural: (ii)(iii)(iv)	—	1997		
Ancient Villages in Southern Anhui – Xidi and Hongcun	Small street lined by white houses with tile roofs.	Huangshan City, Yi County, Anhui, China; 29°54′16″N 117°59′15″E	Cultural: (iii)(iv)(v)	52 (130); buffer zone 730 (1,800)	2000		
Archaeological Ruins of Liangzhu City		Zhejiang, China; 30°23′44″N 119°59′27″E	Cultural: (iii)(iv)	1,433.66 (3,542.7); buffer zone 9,980.29 (24,661.8)	2019		
Badain Jaran Desert - Towers of Sand and Lakes		Gansu, Inner Mongolia and Ningxia, China; 40°4′21″N 102°12′36″E	Natural: (vii)(viii)	726,291 (1,794,700); buffer zone 891,114 (2,201,990)	2024		
Baekje Historic Areas	Fortress walls and a gate on the top of a hill	Buyeo, Gongju and Iksan, South Korea; 36°27′43″N 127°07′38″E	Cultural: (ii)(iii)	135.1 (334); buffer zone 303.64 (750.3)	2015		
Beijing Central Axis: A Building Ensemble Exhibiting the Ideal Order of the Chinese Capital		Beijing, China; 39°53′59″N 116°23′30″E	Cultural: (iii)(iv)	589 (1,460); buffer zone 4,542 (11,220)	2024		
Buddhist Monuments in the Horyu-ji Area	A two-storied wooden gate and a pagoda in the background.	Nara Prefecture, Japan; 34°37′0″N 135°44′0″E	Cultural: (i)(ii)(iv)(vi)	15 (37); buffer zone 571 (1,410)	1993		
Capital Cities and Tombs of the Ancient Koguryo Kingdom	Ruins of a low step-pyramid like structure.	Huanren Manchu Autonomous County, Liaoning and Ji'an, Jilin, China; 41°9′25″N 126°11′14″E	Cultural: (i)(ii)(iii)(iv)(v)	4,165 (10,290); buffer zone 14,142 (34,950)	2004		
Changdeokgung Palace Complex	Two storied traditional building with tile roof and walls decorated in red, green and yellow.	Seoul, South Korea; 37°34′46″N 126°59′28″E	Cultural: (ii)(iii)(iv)	—	1997		
Chengjiang Fossil Site	Haikouella lanceolata (Primitif chardate – ancestral vertebrate).	Yunnan, China; 28°25′19″N 106°2′33″E	Natural: (viii)	512 (1,270); buffer zone 220 (540)	2012		
China Danxia		Various regions of China, China; 28°25′19″N 106°2′33″E	Natural: (vii)(viii)	82,151 (203,000); buffer zone 218,357 (539,570)	2010		
Classical Gardens of Suzhou	Chinese style pavilion near a pond with lotuses.	Suzhou, Jiangsu, China; 31°19′0″N 120°27′0″E	Cultural: (i)(ii)(iii)(iv)(v)	12 (30); buffer zone 27 (67)	1997 (Note: Significant modifications in 2026)		
Complex of Koguryo Tombs	Mural of men on horses with bows and arrows shooting deer.	Pyongyang and Nampho, North Korea; 38°51′47″N 125°24′54″E	Cultural: (i)(ii)(iii)(iv)	233 (580); buffer zone 1,701 (4,200)	2004		
Cultural Landscape of Honghe Hani Rice Terraces	Rice Terraces in southern China.	Yuanyang County, Yunnan, China; 23°5′36″N 102°46′48″E	Cultural: (iii)(v)	16,603 (41,030); buffer zone 29,501 (72,900)	2013		
Cultural Landscape of Old Tea Forests of the Jingmai Mountain in Pu’er		Yunnan, China; 22°11′3″N 100°0′27″E	Cultural: (iii)(v)	7,168 (17,710); buffer zone 11,928 (29,470)	2023		
Dazu Rock Carvings	Stone sculptures of people interacting with each other and in the background a row of much larger seated buddha sculptures.	Chongqing, China; 29°42′4″N 105°42′18″E	Cultural: (i)(ii)(iii)	20 (49); buffer zone 211 (520)	1999		
Deer Stone Monuments and Related Bronze Age Sites		Khövsgöl and Arkhangai, Mongolia; 47°44′34″N 101°13′33″E	Cultural: (i)(iii)	9,769 (24,140); buffer zone 31,970 (79,000)	2023		
Fanjingshan	The "Red Cloud Golden Peak" (New Golden Peak) of Fanjingshan.	Guizhou, China; 27°53′44″N 108°40′48″E	Natural: (x)	40,275 (99,520); buffer zone 37,239 (92,020)	2018		
Fujian Tulou	A number of circular buildings with an interior courtyard. There are only few and small windows to the outside and balconies on the inner courtyard side.	Fujian, China; 25°1′23″N 117°41′9″E	Cultural: (iii)(iv)(v)	153 (380); buffer zone 935 (2,310)	2008		
Fujisan, sacred place and source of artistic inspiration	Mount Fuji from Oshino-Hakkai	Chūbu region, Japan; 35°21′39″N 138°43′39″E	Cultural: (iii)(vi)	20,702 (51,160); buffer zone 49,628 (122,630)	2013		
Gaya Tumuli	Gaya Tumuli in Changnyeong	Changnyeong, Gimhae, Goryeong, Goseong, Haman, Hapcheon and Namwon, South Korea; 35°14′14.15″N 128°52′25.41″E	Cultural: (iii)	189 (470); buffer zone 964.8 (2,384)	2023		
Getbol, Korean Tidal Flats	Gochang Getbol	Boseong, Gochang, Goheung, Muan, Seocheon, Seosan, Sinan, Suncheon and Yeosu, South Korea; 35°27′35″N 126°26′42″E	Natural: (x)	156,386 (386,440); buffer zone 105,303 (260,210)	2021 (Note: Significant modifications in 2026)		
Gochang, Hwasun and Ganghwa Dolmen Sites	A tall dolmen consisting of two standing stones carrying one horizontal stone on top.	Gochang, Jeollabuk-do; Hwasun, Jeollanam-do and Ganghwa, Incheon, South Korea; 34°58′0″N 126°55′45″E	Cultural: (iii)	52 (130); buffer zone 315 (780)	2000		
Great Burkhan Khaldun Mountain and its surrounding sacred landscape		Khentii Province, Mongolia; 48°45′43″N 109°00′37″E	Cultural: (iv)(vi)	443,739 (1,096,500); buffer zone 271,651 (671,260)	2015		
Gusuku Sites and Related Properties of the Kingdom of Ryukyu	Complex of traditional houses with red tile roofs and a grey wall.	Okinawa Prefecture, Japan; 26°12′31″N 127°40′58″E	Cultural: (ii)(iii)(vi)	55 (140); buffer zone 560 (1,400)	2000		
Gyeongju Historic Areas	Several grass covered mounds.	Gyeongju, Gyeongsangbuk-do, South Korea; 35°47′20″N 129°13′36″E	Cultural: (ii)(iii)	2,880 (7,100); buffer zone 350 (860)	2000		
Haeinsa Temple Janggyeong Panjeon, the Depositories for the Tripitaka Koreana Woodblocks	A very long bookshelf with identically looking books in a corridor.	Hapcheon, Gyeongsangnam-do, South Korea; 35°48′0″N 128°6′0″E	Cultural: (iv)(vi)	—	1995		
Hidden Christian Sites in the Nagasaki Region	A Catholic cathedral made of wood in Japan.	Nagasaki Prefecture, Japan; 32.734106°N 129.870236°E	Cultural: (iii)	5,566.55 (13,755.2); buffer zone 12,252.52 (30,276.6)	2018		
Himeji-jo	A multistoried white castle donjon with several small towers and a main tower on a platform of stone.	Hyōgo Prefecture, Japan; 34°50′0″N 134°42′0″E	Cultural: (i)(iv)	107 (260); buffer zone 143 (350)	1993		
Hiraizumi – Temples, Gardens and Archaeological Sites Representing the Buddhist Pure Land	Small rocks in a lake.	Iwate Prefecture, Japan; 34°37′0″N 135°44′0″E	Cultural: (ii)(vi)	176 (430); buffer zone 6,008 (14,850)	2011		
Hiroshima Peace Memorial (Genbaku Dome)	Ruins of a building with a dome.	Hiroshima, Hiroshima Prefecture, Japan; 34°23′0″N 132°27′0″E	Cultural: (vi)	0.40 (0.99); buffer zone 43 (110)	1996		
Historic Centre of Macao	Facade of a church. The rest of the building does not exist.	Macau Special Administrative Region, China; 22°11′29″N 113°32′11″E	Cultural: (ii)(iii)(iv)(vi)	16 (40); buffer zone 107 (260)	2005		
Historic Ensemble of the Potala Palace, Lhasa	A large red and white building complex built on a rocky hill.	Lhasa, Tibet Autonomous Region, China; 29°39′29″N 91°7′2″E	Cultural: (i)(iv)(vi)	61 (150); buffer zone 199 (490)	1994 (Note: Extended in 2000 to include the Jokhang Temple and in 2001 to include the Norbulingka area. Accordingly the name of the site changed from Potala Palace at time of first inscription over Potala Palace and the Jokhang Temple Monastery in 2000 to the present name in 2001.)		
Historic Monuments and Sites in Kaesong	The old city gate in the center of Kaesong.	Kaesong, North Korea; 37°58′54″N 126°30′29″E	Cultural: (ii)(iii)	494 (1,220); buffer zone 5,222 (12,900)	2013		
Historic Monuments of Ancient Kyoto (Kyoto, Uji and Otsu Cities)	A three storied pavilion. The lower story is in wood and white color, the two upper stories golden.	Kyoto and Shiga Prefectures, Japan; 34°58′50″N 135°46′10″E	Cultural: (ii)(iv)	1,056 (2,610); buffer zone 3,579 (8,840)	1994		
Historic Monuments of Ancient Nara	A large building with wooden beams and white walls.	Nara, Nara Prefecture, Japan; 34°40′32″N 135°50′22″E	Cultural: (ii)(iii)(iv)(vi)	617 (1,520); buffer zone 2,502 (6,180)	1998		
Historic Monuments of Dengfeng in “The Centre of Heaven and Earth”	A red building with a tile roof.	Henan, China; 34°27′32″N 113°4′4″E	Cultural: (iii)(vi)	825 (2,040); buffer zone 3,438 (8,500)	2010		
Historic Villages of Korea: Hahoe and Yangdong	Overview of a village with traditional houses.	Andong and Gyeongju, Gyeongsangbuk-do, South Korea; 36°32′21″N 128°31′0″E	Cultural: (iii)(iv)	600 (1,500); buffer zone 885 (2,190)	2010		
Historic Villages of Shirakawa-go and Gokayama	A village with wooden houses with steep roofs.	Gifu and Toyama Prefectures, Japan; 36°24′0″N 136°53′0″E	Cultural: (iv)(v)	68 (170); buffer zone 58,873 (145,480)	1995		
Huanglong Scenic and Historic Interest Area	Turquoise colored limestone ponds.	Songpan County, Sichuan, China; 32°45′15″N 103°49′20″E	Natural: (vii)	60,000 (150,000)	1992		
Hubei Shennongjia		Hubei, China; 31°44′41″N 110°40′33″E	Natural: (ix)(x)	79,624 (196,760); buffer zone 45,390 (112,200)	2016		
Hwaseong Fortress	Wall, tower and roofs of one larger building of a fortress.	Suwon, Gyeonggi-do, South Korea; 37°16′20″N 127°0′30″E	Cultural: (ii)(iii)	—	1997		
Imperial Palaces of the Ming and Qing Dynasties in Beijing and Shenyang	A large building with red roof on the top of a white staircase.	Beijing and Shenyang, China; 41°47′39″N 123°26′49″E	Cultural: (i)(ii)(iii)(iv)	13 (32); buffer zone 153 (380)	1987 (Note: Extended in 2004 to include the Mukden Palace and name change from Imperial Palace of the Ming and Qing Dynasties to the present name.)		
Imperial Tombs of the Ming and Qing Dynasties	Gate at the Ming Dynasty Tombs in Beijing.	Nanjing, Jiangsu; Changping District, Beijing; Liaoning; Hubei, China; 41°42′26″N 124°47′38″E	Cultural: (i)(ii)(iii)(iv)(vi)	3,435 (8,490); buffer zone 23,429 (57,890)	2000 (Note: Extended in 2003 to include the Ming Dynasty Tombs, the Ming Xiaoling Mausoleum and the tombs of Chang Yuchun, Qiu Cheng, Wu Liang, Wu Zhen, Xu Da and Li Wenzhong; and in 2004 to include the Liaoning Tombs (Yongling, Fuling and Zhaoling).)		
Itsukushima Shinto Shrine	Red and white wooden buildings over water and a large wooden gate in the water.	Itsukushima, Hiroshima Prefecture, Japan; 34°17′40″N 132°19′29″E	Cultural: (i)(ii)(iv)(vi)	431 (1,070); buffer zone 2,634 (6,510)	1996		
Iwami Ginzan Silver Mine and its Cultural Landscape	Ruins of terraces built on a hillside.	Ōda, Shimane Prefecture, Japan; 35°6′46″N 132°26′6″E	Cultural: (ii)(iii)(v)	529 (1,310); buffer zone 3,134 (7,740)	2007 (Note: Minor modification of boundaries in 2010.)		
Jeju Volcanic Island and Lava Tubes	View into an inactive volcanic crater with a small like.	Jeju-do, South Korea; 33°28′8″N 126°43′13″E	Natural: (vii)(viii)	9,475 (23,410); buffer zone 9,371 (23,160)	2007		
Jingdezhen Handicraft Porcelain Industry Sites		Jiangxi, China; 29°17′50″N 117°12′07″E	Cultural: (ii)(iii)(iv)(vi)	1,979 (4,890); buffer zone 5,546 (13,700)	2026		
Jiuzhaigou Valley Scenic and Historic Interest Area	Mountain valley with a green, blue and turquoise colored river.	Jiuzhaigou County, Sichuan, China; 33°5′0″N 103°55′0″E	Natural: (vii)	72,000 (180,000)	1992		
Jōmon Prehistoric Sites in Northern Japan		Akita, Aomori, Hokkaidō and Iwate Prefectures,Japan; 41°03′56″N 140°33′08″E	Cultural: (iii)(v)	142 (350); buffer zone 985 (2,430)	2021		
Jongmyo Shrine	Very wide and narrow building with a prominent roof and red columns.	Seoul, South Korea; 37°33′0″N 126°59′0″E	Cultural: (iv)	19 (47)	1995		
Kaiping Diaolou and Villages	A multi-storied tower like house with white walls.	Guangdong, China; 29°54′16″N 117°59′15″E	Cultural: (ii)(iii)(iv)	372 (920); buffer zone 2,738 (6,770)	2007		
Kulangsu, a Historic International Settlement		Xiamen, Fujian, China; 24°26′51″N 118°03′43″E	Cultural: (ii)(iv)	316 (780); buffer zone 886 (2,190)	2017		
Landscapes of Dauria		Dornod Province, Mongolia*; Zabaykalsky Krai, Russia*; 49°55′N 115°25′E	Natural: (ix), (x)	912,624 (2,255,140); buffer zone 307,317 (759,400)	2017		
Longmen Grottoes	Carved Buddhist deities in a rock face.	Luoyang, Henan, China; 34°28′0″N 112°28′0″E	Cultural: (i)(ii)(iii)	331 (820); buffer zone 1,042 (2,570)	2000		
Lushan National Park	A long stone bridge crossing a lake.	Jiujiang, Jiangxi, China; 29°26′0″N 115°52′0″E	Cultural: (ii)(iii)(iv)(vi)	—	1996		
Mausoleum of the First Qin Emperor	A large number of lined up human sculptures in a pit.	Lintong District, Xi'an, Shaanxi, China; 34°23′0″N 109°6′0″E	Cultural: (i)(iii)(iv)(vi)	—	1987		
Migratory Bird Sanctuaries along the Coast of Yellow Sea–Bohai Gulf of China (Phase I)		Jiangsu, China; 32°55′55″N 121°1′0.53″E	Natural: (x)	188,643 (466,150); buffer zone 80,056 (197,820)	2019		
Mogao Caves	Mural in 9th century showing bandit attack	Dunhuang, Gansu, China; 40°8′0″N 94°49′0″E	Cultural: (i)(ii)(iii)(iv)(v)(vi)	—	1987		
Mountain Resort and its Outlying Temples, Chengde	Several pavilions near a lotus pond.	Chengde, Hebei, China; 40°59′13″N 117°56′18″E	Cultural: (ii)(iv)	—	1994		
Mount Emei Scenic Area, including Leshan Giant Buddha Scenic Area	A giant seated buddha cut from a rock face.	Emeishan City, Sichuan, China; 29°32′42″N 103°46′10″E	Mixed: (iv)(vi)(x)	15,400 (38,000)	1996		
Mount Huangshan	Rocky mountain landscape with pine trees.	Anhui, China; 30°10′N 118°11′E	Mixed: (ii)(vii)(x)	15,400 (38,000)	1990		
Mount Kumgang – Diamond Mountain from the Sea		Kangwon Province, North Korea; 38°39′24″N 128°06′18″E	Mixed: (iii)(vii)	19,828 (49,000); buffer zone 70,350 (173,800)	2025		
Mount Qingcheng and the Dujiangyan Irrigation System	A dark Chinese-style temple.	Dujiangyan City, Sichuan, China; 29°42′4″N 105°42′18″E	Cultural: (ii)(iv)(vi)	—	2000		
Mount Sanqingshan National Park	Rock pinnacles in the fog.	Jiangxi, China; 28°54′57″N 118°3′52″E	Natural: (vii)	22,950 (56,700); buffer zone 16,850 (41,600)	2008		
Mount Taishan	Red two-storied building in a rocky mountain landscape.	Tai'an and Jinan, Shandong, China; 36°16′N 117°6′E	Mixed: (i)(ii)(iii)(iv)(v)(vi)(vii)	25,000 (62,000)	1987		
Mount Wutai	A temple in the mountains with a white stupa in the background	Shanxi, China; 39°1′50″N 113°33′48″E	Cultural: (ii)(iii)(iv)(vi)	18,415 (45,500); buffer zone 42,312 (104,560)	2009		
Mount Wuyi	A river lined by dense vegetation and steep rocks.	Wuyishan City, Fujian, China; 27°43′N 117°41′E	Mixed: (iii)(vi)(vii)(x)	99,975 (247,040); buffer zone 27,888 (68,910)	1999		
Mozu-Furuichi Kofun Group	Daisen-Kofun, the tomb of Emperor Nintoku, Osaka.	Osaka Prefecture, Japan; 34°33′44″N 135°36′34″E	Cultural: (iii)(iv)	166.66 (411.8); buffer zone 890 (2,200)	2019		
Namhansanseong	Namhansanseong South gate	Gwangju, Gyeonggi-do, South Korea; 37°28′44″N 127°10′52″E	Cultural: (ii)(iv)	409.06 (1,010.8); buffer zone 853.71 (2,109.6)	2014		
Ogasawara Islands	Sea, beach and rocks.	Ogasawara Subprefecture, Japan; 27°43′6″N 142°5′59″E	Natural: (ix)	7,939 (19,620)	2011		
Old Town of Lijiang	A small stone bridge across a small channel. On the opposite site there is a two storied red building with a three storied gate tower.	Lijiang, Yunnan, China; 26°52′0″N 100°14′0″E	Cultural: (ii)(iv)(v)	—	1997		
Orkhon Valley Cultural Landscape	River running through a desert landscape. There are some trees near the river.	Orkhon Province, Mongolia; 47°33′N 102°50′E	Cultural: (ii)(iii)(iv)	121,976 (301,410); buffer zone 61,044 (150,840)	2004		
Peking Man Site at Zhoukoudian	Narrow rocky gorge. A plaque with Chinese text is attached to the rock.	Fangshan District, Beijing, China; 39°44′0″N 115°55′0″E	Cultural: (iii)(vi)	—	1987		
Petroglyphic Complexes of the Mongolian Altai		Mongolia; 49°20′N 88°24′E	Cultural: (iii)	11,300 (28,000); buffer zone 10,700 (26,000)	2011		
Petroglyphs along the Bangucheon Stream		Ulsan, South Korea; 35°36′30.42″N 129°10′26.39″E	Cultural: (i)(iii)	43.69 (108.0); buffer zone 144.15 (356.2)	2025		
Qinghai Hoh Xil		Qinghai, China; 35°22′49″N 92°26′21″E	Natural: (vii)(x)	3,735,632 (9,230,950); buffer zone 2,290,904 (5,660,950)	2017		
Quanzhou: Emporium of the World in Song-Yuan China		Fujian, China; 24°52′28″N 118°40′33″E	Cultural: (iv)	536 (1,320); buffer zone 11,126 (27,490)	2021		
Royal Tombs of the Joseon Dynasty	A stone sculpture of a horse and a man, a stone column and a grass covered mound surrounded by a carved stone fence.	South Korea; 37°11′50″N 128°27′10″E	Cultural: (iii)(iv)(vi)	1,891 (4,670); buffer zone 4,660 (11,500)	2009		
Sacred Island of Okinoshima and Associated Sites in the Munakata Region		Fukuoka Prefecture, Japan; 34°14′42″N 130°6′20″E	Cultural: (ii)(iii)	98.93 (244.5); buffer zone 79,363 (196,110)	2017		
Sacred Sites and Pilgrimage Routes in the Kii Mountain Range	A small gate and stairs through a forest.	Mie, Nara and Wakayama Prefectures, Japan; 33°50′13″N 135°46′35″E	Cultural: (ii)(iii)(iv)(vi)	495 (1,220); buffer zone 1,137 (2,810)	2004		
Sado Island Gold Mines		Niigata Prefecture, Japan; 38°2′29.83″N 138°15′21.17″E	Cultural: (iv)	751 (1,860); buffer zone 1,527 (3,770)	2024		
Sansa, Buddhist Mountain Monasteries in Korea	Buddhist temple with a large golden statue in a mountain setting	Tongdosa, Buseoksa, Bongjeongsa, Beopjusa, Magoksa, Seonamsa and Daeheungsa, South Korea. 35°29′17″N 129°03′56″E	Cultural: (iii)	55.43 (137.0); buffer zone 1,323.11 (3,269.5)	2018		
Seokguram Grotto and Bulguksa Temple	Figure of a seated buddha.	Gyeongju, Gyeongsangbuk-do, South Korea; 35°47′0″N 129°21′0″E	Cultural: (i)(iv)	—	1995		
Seowon, Korean Neo-Confucian Academies	Dosan Seowon in Andong	South Korea; 36°43′38.27″N 128°50′36.34″E	Cultural: (iii)	102.49 (253.3); buffer zone 796.74 (1,968.8)	2019		
Shirakami-Sanchi	A forested mountain landscape.	Ajigasawa and Fukaura, Nishitsugaru District, Aomori Prefecture; Fujisato, Yamamoto District, Akita Prefecture, Japan; 40°28′12″N 140°7′48″E	Natural: (ix)	16,939 (41,860)	1993		
Shiretoko	Mountains reflected in a lake.	Hokkaido Prefecture, Japan; 43°56′58″N 144°57′57″E	Natural: (ix)(x)	71,100 (176,000)	2005		
Shrines and Temples of Nikko	Several traditional buildings including a gate.	Nikkō, Tochigi Prefecture, Japan; 36°44′51″N 139°36′38″E	Cultural: (i)(iv)(vi)	51 (130); buffer zone 373 (920)	1999		
Sichuan Giant Panda Sanctuaries	Three giant panda on grass.	Sichuan, China; 30°50′0″N 103°0′0″E	Natural: (x)	924,500 (2,284,000); buffer zone 527,100 (1,302,000)	2006		
Silk Roads: the Routes Network of Chang'an-Tianshan Corridor		22 sites in China*: Luoyang, Lingbao and Xin'an of Henan Province; Xi'an, Bin County and Chenggu of Shaanxi Province; Tianshui, Yongjing, Dunhuang and Anxi of Gansu Province; Turpan, Jimsar and Kuqa of Xinjiang Uyghur Autonomous Region. 8 sites in Kazakhstan*: Almaty Region and Jambyl Region. 3 sites in Kyrgyzstan*: Chüy Region; 34°18′16″N 108°51′26″E	Cultural: (ii)(iii)(iv)(vi)	42,668.16 (105,435.3); buffer zone 189,963.13 (469,409.1)	2014		
Site of Xanadu	The Kingdome of China", one of the first English-language maps of China with a geographically incorrect placing of Xandu.	Inner Mongolia, China; 30°50′0″N 103°0′0″E	Cultural: (ii) (iii) (iv) (vi)	25,131 (62,100); buffer zone 150,722 (372,440)	2012		
Sites of Japan’s Meiji Industrial Revolution: Iron and Steel, Shipbuilding and Coal Mining		Various regions of Japan, Japan; 34°25′50″N 131°24′44″E	Cultural: (ii)(iv)	307 (760); buffer zone 2,408 (5,950)	2015		
South China Karst	Grey rock pillars.	Guangxi, Guizhou and Yunnan, China; 25°13′15″N 107°58′30″E	Natural: (vii)(viii)	47,588 (117,590); buffer zone 98,428 (243,220)	2007		
Summer Palace, an Imperial Garden in Beijing	Hall for Dispelling the Clouds.	Beijing, China; 39°54′38″N 116°8′28″E	Cultural: (i)(ii)(iii)	—	1998		
Temple and Cemetery of Confucius and the Kong Family Mansion in Qufu	Small Chinese pavilion on a platform.	Qufu, Shandong, China; 35°36′42″N 116°58′30″E	Cultural: (i)(iv)(vi)	—	1994		
Temple of Heaven: an Imperial Sacrificial Altar in Beijing	A multi-level circular building at the top of white staircases.	Beijing, China; 39°50′44″N 116°26′41″E	Cultural: (i)(ii)(iii)	—	1998		
The Architectural Work of Le Corbusier, an Outstanding Contribution to the Modern Movement		Argentina*, Belgium*, France*, Germany*, India*, Japan*, Switzerland*; 35°42′55″N 139°46′33″E	Cultural: (i)(ii)(vi)	—	2016		
The Grand Canal		Various regions of China, China; 30°15′41″N 120°13′26″E	Cultural: (i)(iii)(iv)(vi)	20,819 (51,440); buffer zone 55,629 (137,460)	2014		
The Great Wall	A high defensive wall with watch towers running through a mountain landscape.	Various regions of China, China; 40°25′N 116°5′E	Cultural: (i)(ii)(iii)(iv)(vi)	—	1987		
Three Parallel Rivers of Yunnan Protected Areas	River running through a gorge in a desert mountain landscape.	Yunnan, China; 27°53′42″N 98°24′23″E	Natural: (vii)(viii)(ix)(x)	—	2003 (Note: Minor modification in 2010.)		
Tomioka Silk Mill and Related Sites		Gunma Prefecture, Japan; 36°15′19″N 138°53′16″E	Cultural: (ii)(iv)	7.2 (18); buffer zone 414.6 (1,024)	2014		
Tusi Sites		Guizhou, Hubei and Hunan, China; 28°59′55″N 109°58′1″E	Cultural: (ii)(iii)	781 (1,930); buffer zone 3,125 (7,720)	2015		
Uvs Nuur Basin		Uvs, Zavkhan and Khövsgöl Provinces Mongolia*; Mongun-Tayginsky, Ovyursky, Tes-Khemsky and Erzinsky Districts, Tuva Republic, Russia*; 50°16′30″N 92°43′1″E	Natural: (ix)(x)	898,064 (2,219,160); buffer zone170,790 (422,000)	2003		
West Lake Cultural Landscape of Hangzhou	A lake with a bridge and a pagoda on the lakeside.	Hangzhou, Zhejiang, China; 30°14′15″N 120°8′27″E	Cultural: (ii)(iii)(vi)	3,323 (8,210); buffer zone 7,270 (18,000)	2011		
Wulingyuan Scenic and Historic Interest Area	Mountain landscape with rock pillars.	Wulingyuan District, Zhangjiajie, Hunan, China; 29°20′0″N 110°30′0″E	Natural: (vii)	26,400 (65,000)	1992		
Xinjiang Tianshan	Flying over the Tian Shan mountains.	Xinjiang, China; 41°58′6″N 80°21′15″E	Natural: (vii)(ix)	606,833 (1,499,520)	2013		
Xixia Imperial Tombs		Ningxia, China; 38°26′06″N 105°59′14″E	Cultural: (ii)(iii)	3,899 (9,630); buffer zone 40,570 (100,300)	2025		
Yakushima	An old tree with thick whitish stem in a densely vegetated forest.	Yakushima, Kumage District, Kagoshima Prefecture, Japan; 30°20′0″N 130°32′0″E	Natural: (vii)(ix)	10,747 (26,560)	1993		
Yin Xu	Archaeological excavation of a pit.	Henan, China; 36°7′36″N 114°18′50″E	Cultural: (ii)(iii)(iv)(vi)	414 (1,020); buffer zone 720 (1,800)	2006		
Yungang Grottoes	Buddhist deities of various sizes carved from rock and painted in many colors.	Datong, Shanxi, China; 40°6′35″N 113°7′20″E	Cultural: (i)(ii)(iii)(iv)	349 (860); buffer zone 847 (2,090)	2001		
Zuojiang Huashan Rock Art Cultural Landscape		Guangxi, China; 22°15′20″N 107°1′23″E	Cultural: (iii)(vi)	6,622 (16,360); buffer zone 12,149 (30,020)	2016		

=== Performance of East Asia in UNESCO ===
The performance of Southeast Asia is contrasted by the performance of South and East Asia. Eastern Asian countries are noted with 'EA'.
