= Sakai City Museum =

Museum in Sakai, Japan

Coordinates: 34°33′31.9″N 135°29′3.3″E

- 堺市博物館
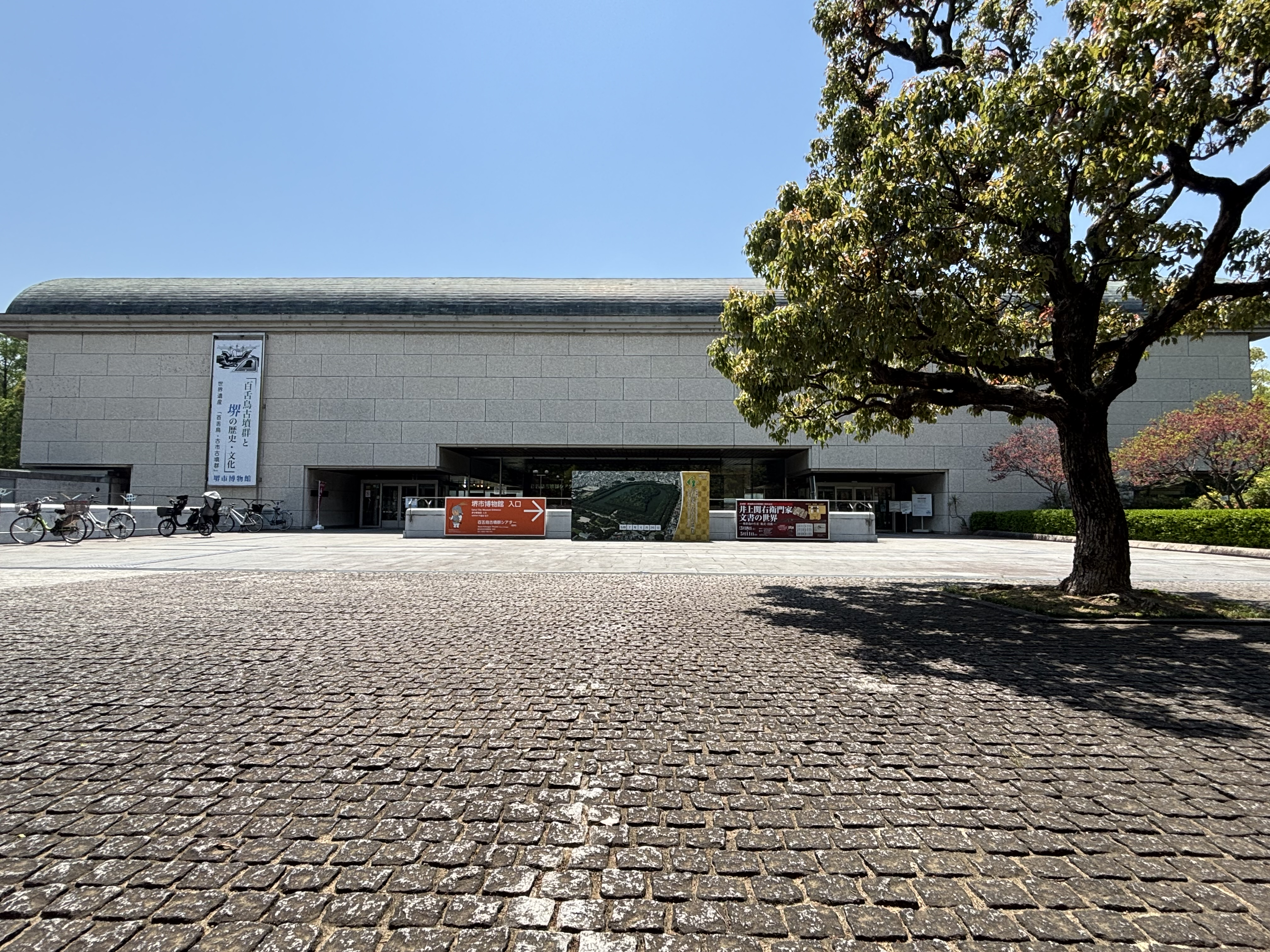
- Established: 1980; 46 years ago
- Location: Sakai, Japan
- Director: Ken'ichi Sudo
- Website: www.city.sakai.lg.jp/kanko/hakubutsukan/index.html

Sakai City Museum (堺市博物館, Sakai-shi Hakubutsukan) is located within Daisen Park, in Sakai-ku, Sakai City, in Osaka Prefecture. The exhibition hall of approx. 1,330 square meters is divided up into areas for ancient times, the middle ages, early modern, and modern times. The museum was opened in 1980, to commemorate the 90th anniversary of Sakai’s municipalization. The present (2017-) director of the museum is Ken'ichi Sudo (ex-director and an emeritus professor at the National Museum of Ethnology). Susumu Nakanishi (Emeritus Professor at the International Research Center for Japanese Studies) was a former (2008-2013) director of the museum.

The museum showcases Sakai’s history from ancient times to the present day, featuring artifacts excavated from the Mozu Kofun Group, represented by the Emperor Nintoku Tumulus (The Mozu Kofun Group was together with the Furuichi Kofun Group, inscribed as a UNESCO World Heritage Site as the Mozu-Furuichi Kofun Group: Mounded Tombs of Ancient Japan, on 6 July 2019.), goods and historical documents remaining from Sakai’s period of high trade as an autonomous city, and materials about Sakai-born historical characters, including Gyōki and Sen-no Rikyu.

The museum is located in Daisen Park, in the middle of the Mozu Kofun Group, along with the Sakai Municipal Library, Sakai Bicycle Museum, Sakai City Japanese Gardens, Sakai City Urban Greenification Center. The International Research Centre for Intangible Cultural Heritage in Asia-Pacific Region opened its office in Sakai City Museum in 2011.

== Facilities ==
- Exhibition room 1 – Kofun and the Emperor Nintoku Tumulus (Kofun)
- Exhibition room 2 – Prosperous Sakai in the Middle Ages
- Exhibition room 3 – Sakai’s Culture and Industries in Early Modern to Modern Times
- Exhibition room 4 – Festivals and Prayer, From the Museum Collection
- Shin’an tea house (Registered tangible cultural property)
- Ōbaian tea house (Registered tangible cultural property)

== Main exhibits ==
- Sandalwood statue of Avalokitesvara (important cultural property) (Asuka period)
- Lacquered drum-shaped sake barrel (important cultural property) (1473)
- Emperor Nintoku’s sarcophagus (replica)
- Emperor Nintoku's armor (replica)
- Horse shaped Haniwa and Haniwa excavated from Emperor Nintoku’s Kofun (replica)
- Iron artifacts excavated from the Otsukayama Kofun
- Clay artifacts (haniwa) excavated from the Ryonan-akayama Kofun
- Old European map of Japan
- Model of “Sakai the city of freedom”
- Sakai guns (matchlock guns)
- Folding Screens "Festival of Sumiyoshi Taisha" (replica) (Original is usually in the storage room and displayed for a limited time)

== Construction history ==
- Founded – 1980
- Completed – 1980
- Design – Nikken Sekkei
- Address – 2 Mozusekiun-cho, Sakai-ku, Sakai City, 590-0802

== Access ==
- 8-minute walk from Mozu Station on the JR Hanwa Line
