= Katsu Nakajima =

Japanese realist painter (born 1954)

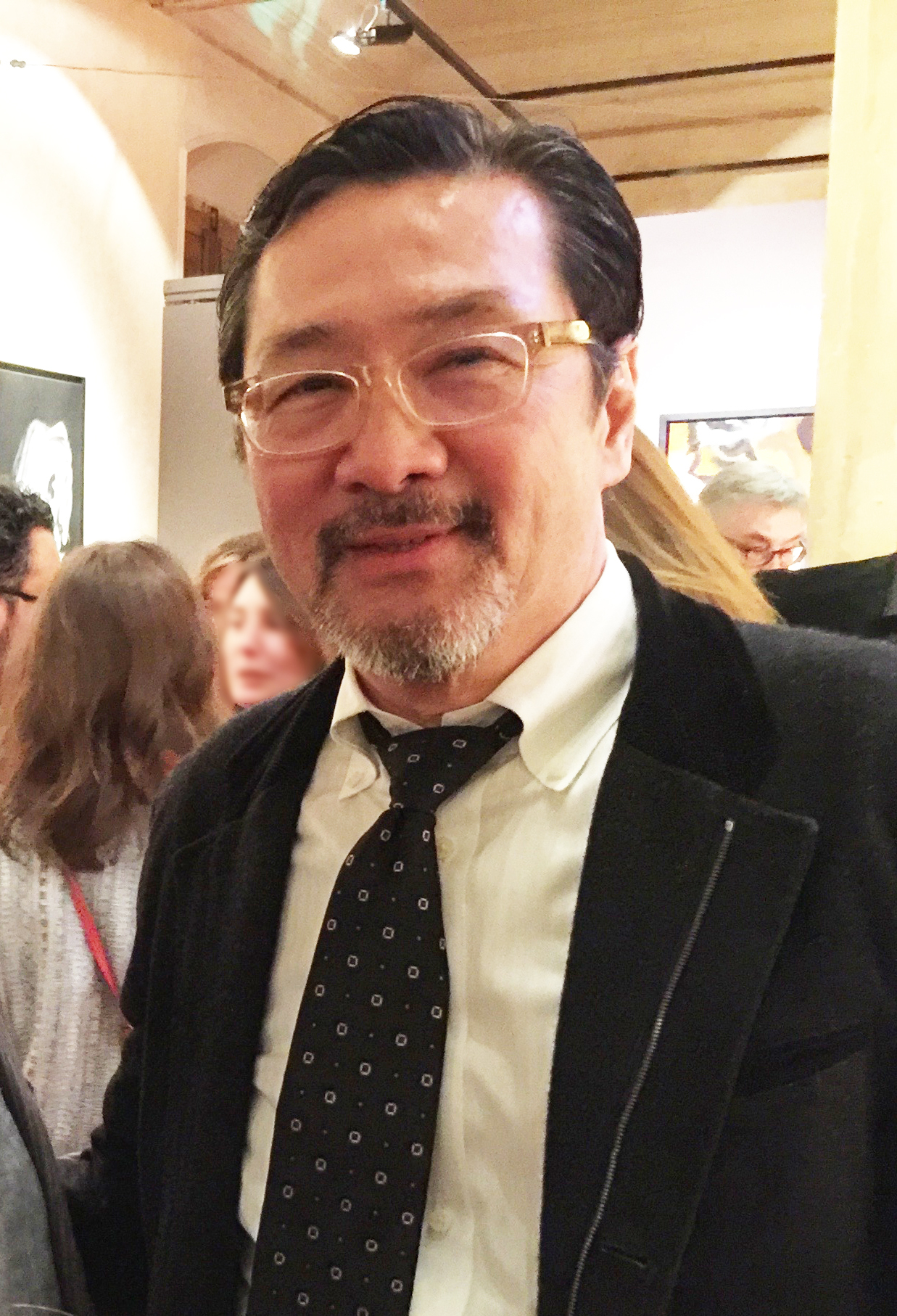
- Nakajima at the MEAM Museum, Barcelona, 2019
- Born: February 15, 1954 (age 72); Osaka Prefecture, Japan
- Education: Doshisha University (Faculty of Engineering)
- Known for: Realist oil paintings incorporating gold leaf
- Movement: Realism
- Awards: William Bouguereau Award (ARC Salon)
- Website: www.katsunakajima.com

Katsu Nakajima (born February 15, 1954) is a Japanese realist painter known for figurative works incorporating gold leaf backgrounds and closely observed landscapes. He began painting seriously after the age of 50. In 2019, he was designated an ARC Living Master by the Art Renewal Center (ARC), a non-profit arts organization based in the United States.

== Early life and education ==
Katsu Nakajima was born in 1954 in Osaka Prefecture, Japan. During his childhood, he grew up in the fields and wooded areas surrounding the Nintoku-Tenno Tomb(now known as the Daisen Kofun ), which served as his everyday playground, spending his formative years in close contact with the natural environment. The Daisen Kofun is the largest keyhole-shaped kofun burial mound in Japan and is regarded as one of the largest burial mounds in the world.

An avid reader of Jean-Henri Fabre's Souvenirs entomologiques (Insectes), Nakajima developed a strong interest in insects from an early age. Through sustained engagement with the natural environment, he cultivated a keen observational sensibility. He has stated that such long-term interaction with nature and attentive observation led him to sense the existence of forces beyond human understanding, which later influenced his approach to painting and visual expression.

In 1973, he entered the Faculty of Engineering at Doshisha University in Kyoto. While conducting laboratory experiments during his studies, he was a member of a university mountaineering club and engaged in mountaineering activities in the Kyoto Kitayama area and the Northern Japanese Alps.

== Career ==
After graduating from the university in 1977, Nakajima moved to Tokyo and entered the field of advertising and graphic design. In 1981, he joined Nippon Design Center, one of Japan's leading design firms. In 1988, he founded his own advertising production company, ISAAC Inc., where he worked as an art director. His work received international recognition, including a silver medal at the 11th Brno International Biennale of Graphic Design (1986), as well as various design awards in Japan and abroad. He remained active in the advertising industry for nearly three decades.

During his years working as an art director, Nakajima developed a deep interest in fly fishing and spent extensive time engaging with natural environments, including fishing trips to North America. Through these experiences, he cultivated a growing interest in entomology and contributed essays to specialized fly fishing magazines. Nakajima has stated that his sustained engagement with nature, accompanied by close and attentive observation, fostered an awareness of forces beyond human control—a sensibility that later informed his approach to painting.

In September 2004, while staying in Karuizawa, Nagano Prefecture, Nakajima witnessed the eruption of Mount Asama. Confronted with the overwhelming force of nature, he instinctively began sketching the scene with a ballpoint pen, an experience that led him to pursue painting.

After stepping away from his career in design and deciding to pursue painting, Nakajima initially held a solo exhibition of watercolor works. He subsequently began working in oil painting. Reflecting on this transition, he has stated that handling oil paint felt entirely natural, as if oil painting had long been familiar to him.

While attending an art school in Tokyo for approximately one year, he devoted himself intensively to production, reportedly using up two full 10-meter rolls of canvas during this period.

From 2008 onward, Nakajima received awards at various open-call exhibitions in Japan and abroad, exhibiting his work primarily through the Hakujitsukai and Nitten(the Japan Fine Arts Exhibition), one of Japan's longest-running and most influential national art exhibitions.

During the 2010s, his work gained international recognition through the International ARC Salon Competition.

In 2018, Nakajima was awarded the William Bouguereau Award at the same competition, with his work selected from over 3,700 submissions worldwide. The award is named after the 19th-century French academic painter William-Adolphe Bouguereau and is presented for excellence in figurative painting. In his capacity as chairman of the Art Renewal Center, Fred Ross praised Nakajima's work Woman in the Forest. In 2019, Nakajima became the first Japanese artist to be recognized as an ARC Living Master.

In the 2020s, he continued to focus on realist painting while holding solo exhibitions, including those at museums.

== Artistic style ==
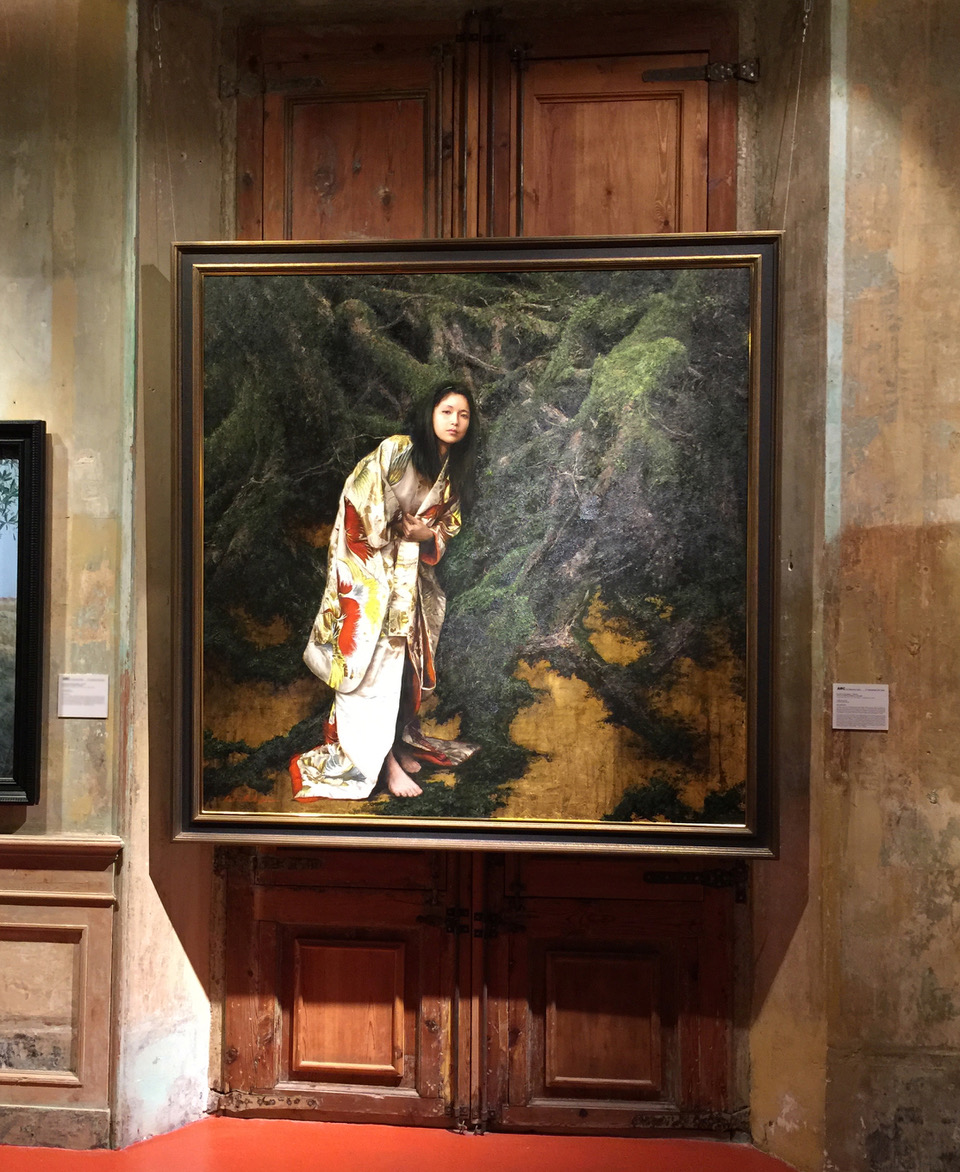
Woman in the Forest (2017), oil painting by Japanese realist painter Katsu Nakajima, exhibited at the MEAM Museum, Barcelona (2019)

Nakajima's work is characterized by realist oil paintings that incorporate gold leaf backgrounds.

Working primarily on canvas, he combines meticulous realism with the reflective and irregular surface of gold leaf, creating compositions in which conventional pictorial space is subtly disrupted.

In his figurative works, Nakajima frequently depicts female figures, rendered with a high degree of realism, emphasizing presence, surface texture, bodily detail, and the material qualities of kimono.

These figures are often set against gold-leaf surfaces that suggest spaces removed from everyday reality. While the compositions may evoke a sense of narrative or psychological depth, they are not confined to a single storyline or symbolic reading, allowing multiple interpretations to coexist.

Across both figurative and landscape works, recurring motifs such as deep forests, dense wooded spaces, mirrors, and living creatures appear without fixed narrative hierarchy. These elements often emerge in seemingly fragmentary or non-linear combinations, suggesting spaces that are neither strictly symbolic nor purely representational.

Such imagery has been noted as resonant with perspectives rooted in East Asian conceptions of nature, where human presence is not privileged over the surrounding environment. Rather than depicting nature as scenery, Nakajima's paintings evoke an animistic sensibility in which natural elements possess agency, presence, and continuity extending beyond human perception.

In his landscape oil paintings, Nakajima avoids iconic or picturesque locations, instead focusing on uninhabited natural environments. Through detailed observation and precise execution, these works emphasize nature as an autonomous presence rather than as scenery or backdrop.

== Selected works ==
=== Figurative works ===
- The Red Gourd of the Day (2013)
- Incarnation (2013)
- Forest of Authenticity (2014)
- Forest of Hesitation (2016)
- Bouquet to Tomorrow (2016)
- Jukai (2017)
- Woman in the Forest (2017)
- Stoic (2019)

=== Landscape works ===
- Sea Roar (2013)
- Stream of the Shadow (Karuizawa–Yukawa) (2016)
- MONONOKE Forest (Shirakoma Pond) (2020)

=== Recent works ===
- Looking Glass World – Pandemic (2020)
- Emerger (2022)
- Red Comb (2022)
- Red String (2023)
- Cormorant Fisher’s Love (2024)
- Moths (2025)
- Moon Goddess (2025)

== Exhibitions ==
Notable exhibitions include:

Nakajima has held solo exhibitions and participated in international exhibitions both in Japan and abroad. In 2023, he presented a solo exhibition at the Ikeda Museum of 20th Century Art in Shizuoka Prefecture, featuring a comprehensive selection of realist paintings spanning his early to recent works. He has also been selected multiple times for international touring exhibitions organized by the Art Renewal Center (ARC), through which his works have been shown in cities including New York and Barcelona.

- Solo exhibition, “Konjiki no Realism (Realism with Gold)”, Ikeda Museum of 20th Century Art, Shizuoka (2023)
- Solo exhibition, “Drawing Boundaries”, Bunshun Gallery, Kioi-cho, Tokyo (2021)
- Solo exhibition, “Mystic”, Gallery Hibiya, Tokyo (2025)
- International ARC Salon Competition touring exhibitions, including New York (Salmagundi Club), Los Angeles (Sotheby's), and Barcelona (MEAM – Museu Europeu d’Art Modern), among others (since 2016)
- 17th/18th International ARC Salon Exhibition, Sotheby's, New York (July 17–27, 2026).

== Awards and Honors ==
Design awards

- Silver Medal, 11th Brno International Biennale of Graphic Design, Brno, Czechoslovakia (1986)

International recognition

- Third Prize (Figurative Painting), Honorable Mention (Figurative), Honorable Mention (Landscape), 11th International ARC Salon Competition (2015)
- Honorable Mention (Figurative), Honorable Mention (Landscape), 12th International ARC Salon Competition (2017)
- William Bouguereau Award, 13th International ARC Salon Competition (2018)
- ARC Living Master designation (2019)
- Honorable Mention (Figurative), 14th International ARC Salon Competition (2020)
- Sheng Xinyu Art Award, 17th International ARC Salon Competition (2025)

Painting awards (Japan)

- Special Prize, Reorganized 1st Nitten (Japan Fine Arts Exhibition) (2014)
- Prime Minister's Award, 92nd Hakujitsukai Exhibition (2016)
- Sompo Japan Nipponkoa Art Foundation Award, 93rd Hakujitsukai Exhibition (2017)
- Special Prize, Reorganized 4th Nitten (Japan Fine Arts Exhibition) (2017)

Other international roles

- Cover selection, Artelibre Arte y Libertad XIII Yearbook (Spain) (2018)
- Selected artist, Mimesis Exhibition, IAACC Pablo Serrano Museum (Zaragoza) – MEAM, Barcelona (2023)

== Publications ==
- Realism with Gold (art book, 2023). Paleta Publishing / Ikeda Museum of 20th Century Art. ISBN 978-4-9912878-0-0.
