= Furuichi Kofun Group =

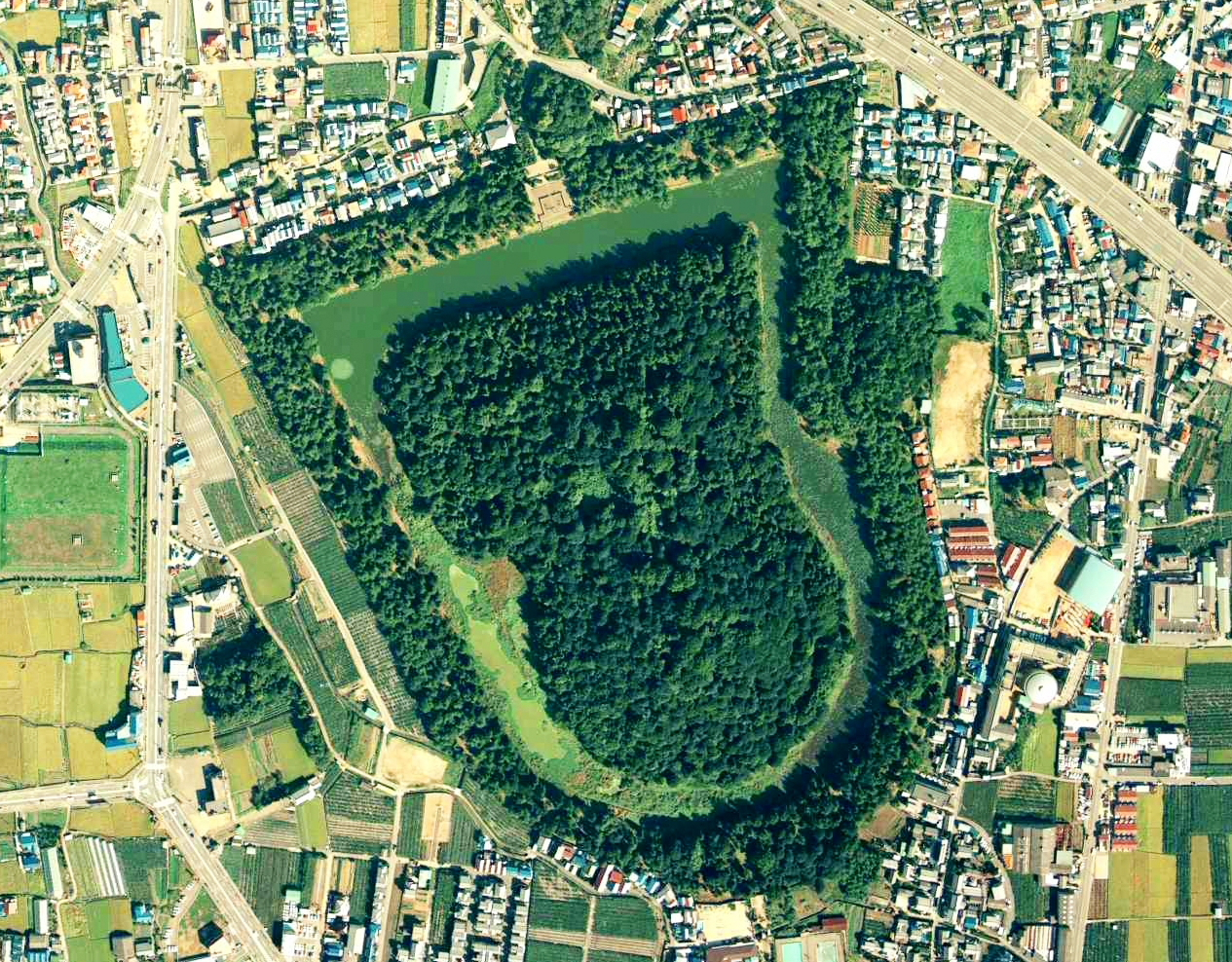
- Kondagobyōyama Kofun. This is the largest in the group.
- Interactive map of Furuichi Kofun Group

Details
- Location: Habikino, Fujiidera, Osaka Prefecture, Japan
- Coordinates: 34°33′46″N 135°36′33″E

UNESCO World Heritage Site
- Official name: Mozu-Furuichi Kofun Group: Mounded Tombs of Ancient Japan
- Criteria: Cultural: (iii), (iv)
- Designated: 2019 (43rd session)
- Reference no.: 1593
- Region: Eastern Asia
- National Historic Site of Japan

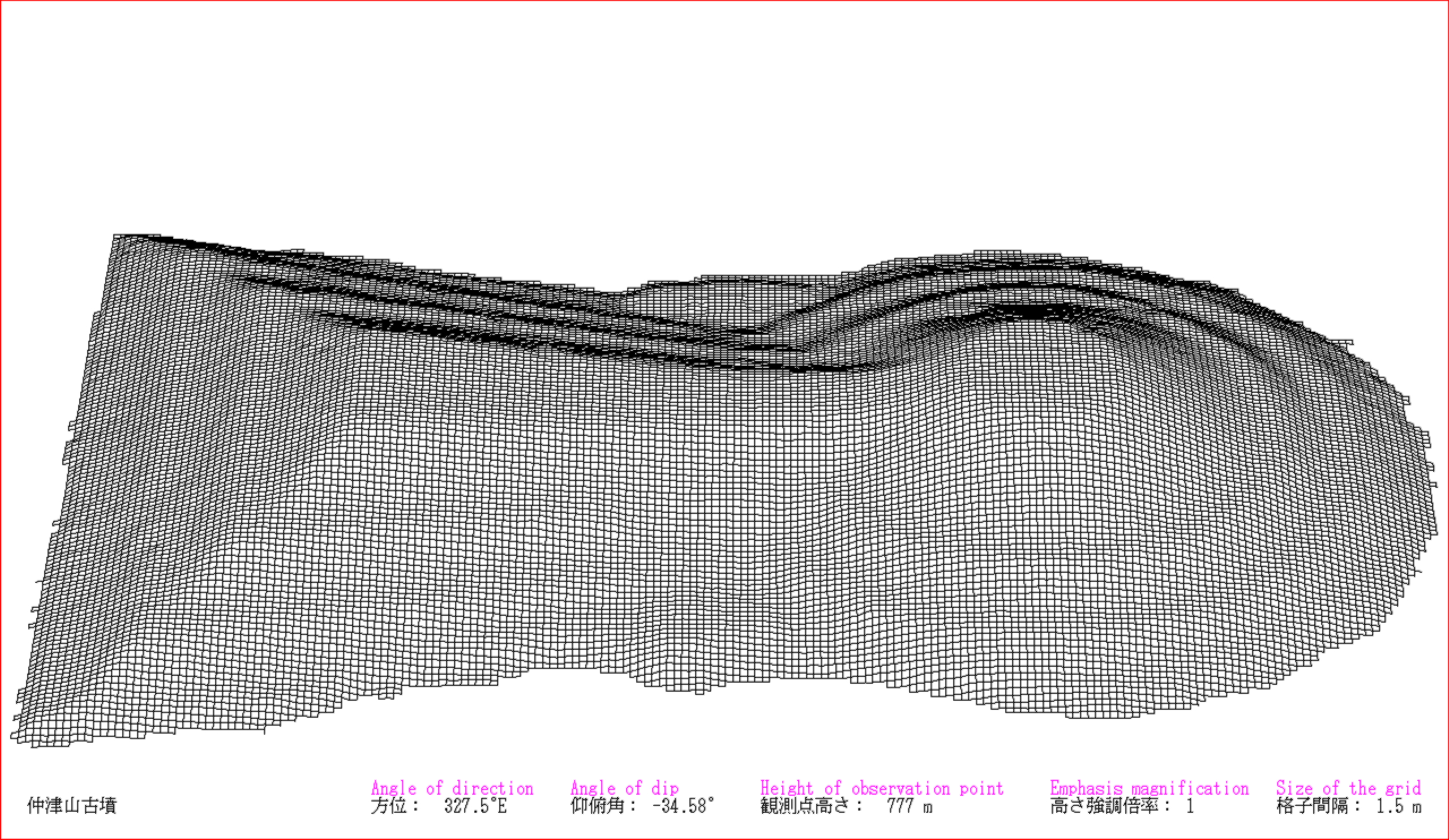
Nakatsuyama Kofun which was drawn in 3DCG.This is the second largest in the group.

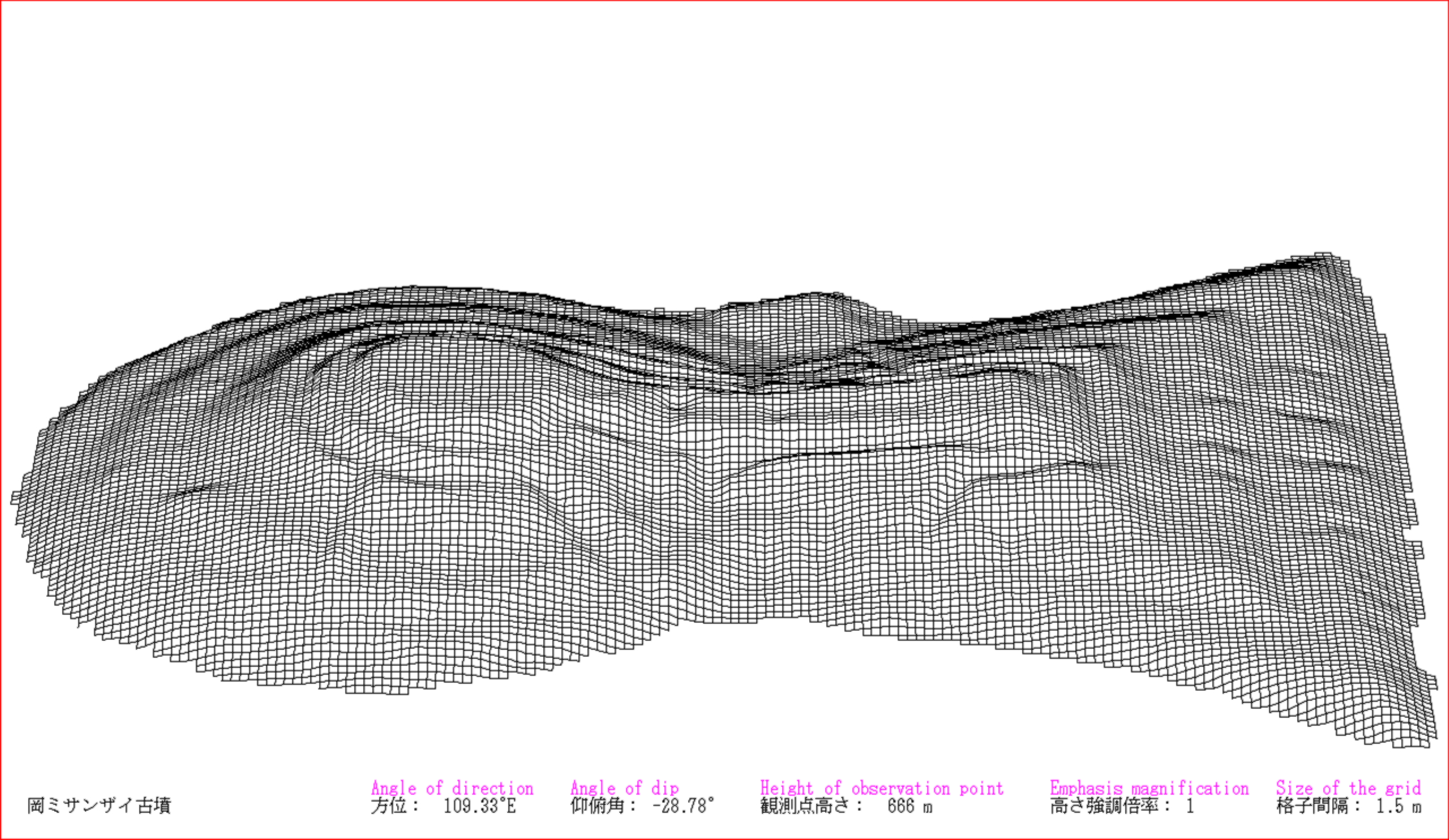
Oka Misanzai Kofun which was drawn in 3DCG.This is the third largest in the group.

Furuichi Kofun Group (古市古墳群, Furuichi Kofun-gun) is a group of Kofun period burial mounds located in the cities of Fujiidera and Habikino, Osaka Prefecture, Japan. Twelve of the tumuli in this group were individually designated a National Historic Site of Japan in 1956, with an additional 14 collectively added to the designation in 2001, and the area under protection expanded in 2018.

== Overview ==
The Furuichi Kofun Group extends over an area of 2.5 kilometers north-to-south by four kilometers east-to-west, covering plateaus and hill with an average elevation of 24 meters above sea level. These tumuli were built between the late 4th and the mid-sixth century AD. Twenty-seven, including many of the larger tumuli, are under the control of the Imperial Household Agency and are classified as "imperial tombs", for which archaeological excavation has been prohibited.

In 2010 the Furuichi Kofun Group of tumuli, along with those of Mozu Kofun Group, were proposed for inscription on the UNESCO World Heritage List. On 6 July 2019, Mozu-Furuichi Kofun Group was inscribed as a UNESCO World Heritage Site under Criteria: (iii), (iv).

== Decline of The Mozu-Furuichi Kofun Group ==
After the Ichinoyama Kofun, the era of grand tomb groups began to decline. Though a few large tombs were still erected, like the Okamisanzai Kofun, the frequency and size began to diminish. The Kawachi Otsukayama Kofun is an outlier, situated between the Mozu and Furuichi Kofun Groups, was built, measuring a staggering 355 meters in length. Its construction during this period remains a mystery, calling for further research and analysis.

As the Furuichi Kofun Group progressed past its prime, the center of tomb construction transitioned to locations such as Shinagadani (also referred to as Kawachi-Asuka), near present-day Taishi Town. The primary locus for tombs in the Kawachi region shifted from Mozu and Furuichi to areas like Shinaga.

== Types ==
- zenpō-kōen-fun (前方後円墳) ("keyhole-shaped) : formerly 31, 26 survive
- empun (円墳) ("circular"): formerly 30, 5 survive
- hōfun (方墳) ("square"): formerly 48, 22 survive
- indeterminate: formerly 14, 34 survive

Total: formerly 123, 87 survive

=== Gallery ===
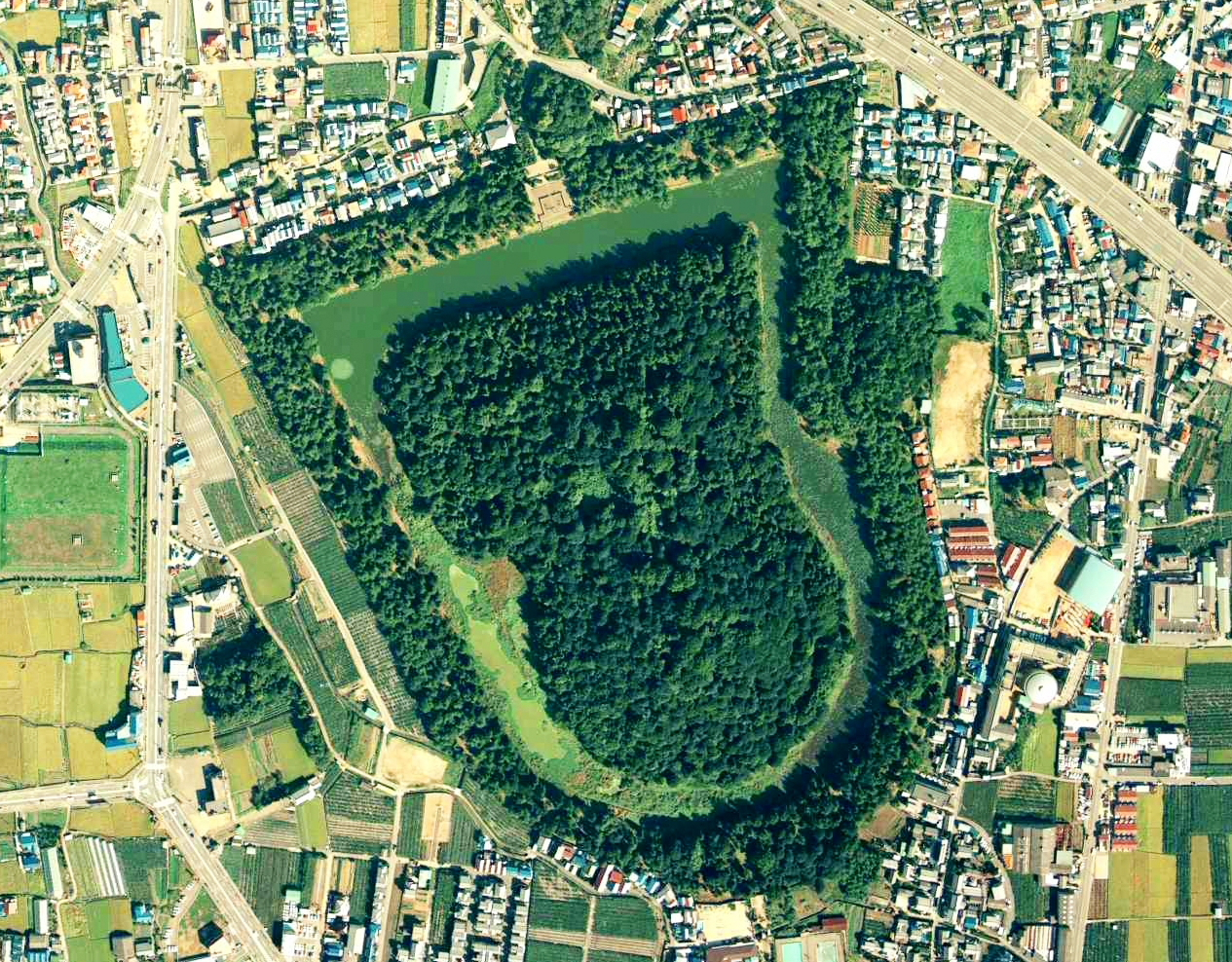
Kondagobyoyama Kofun

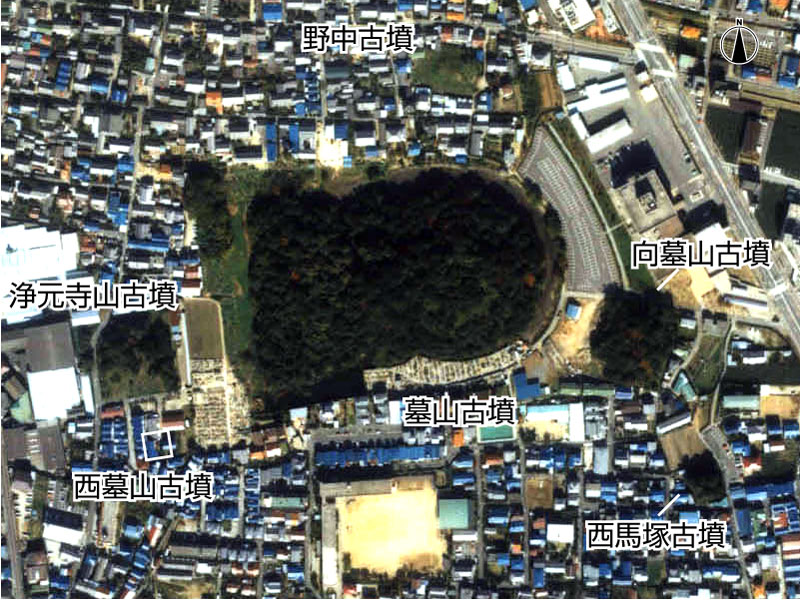
Hakayama Kofun

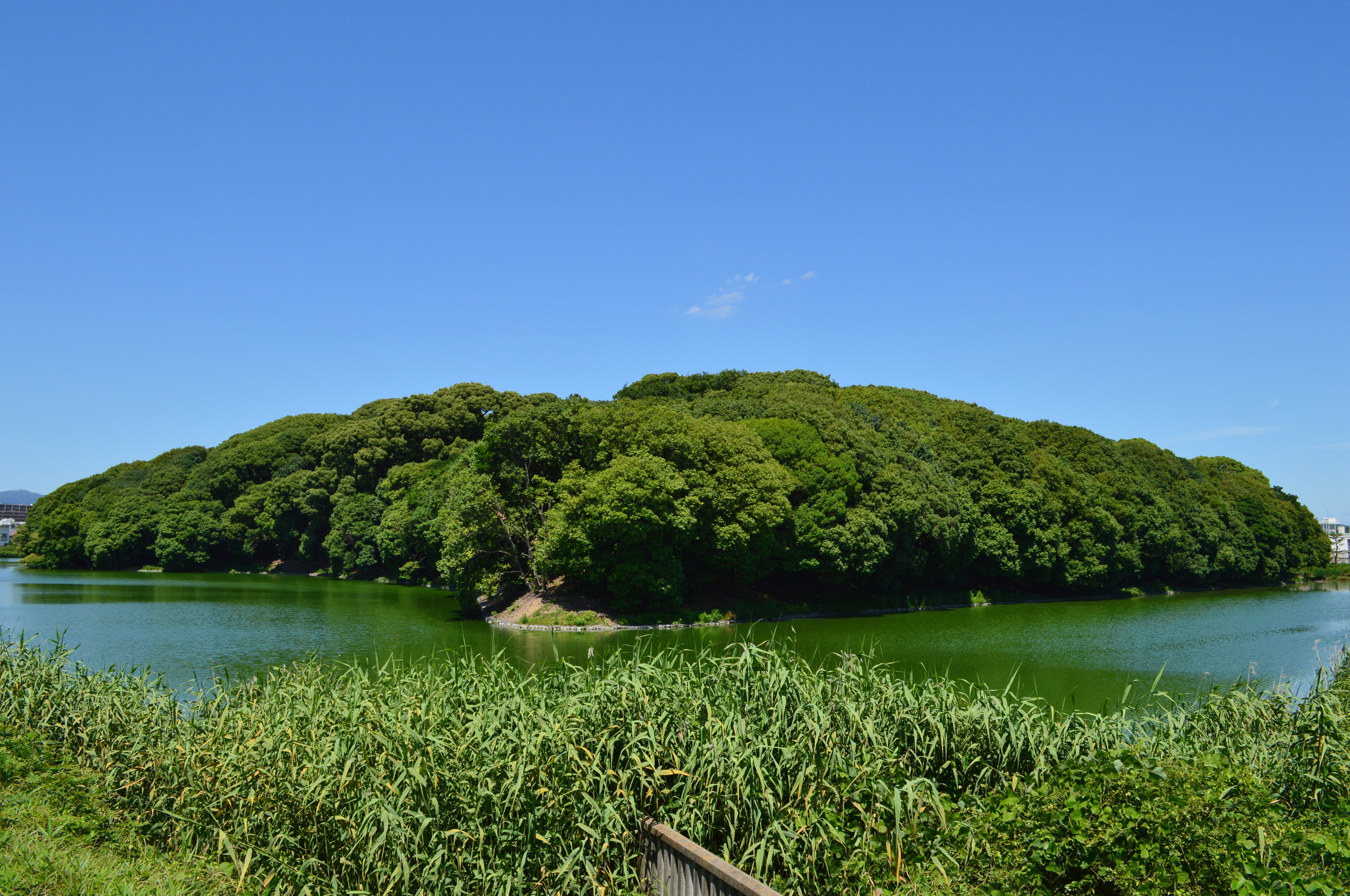
Okamisanzai Kofun

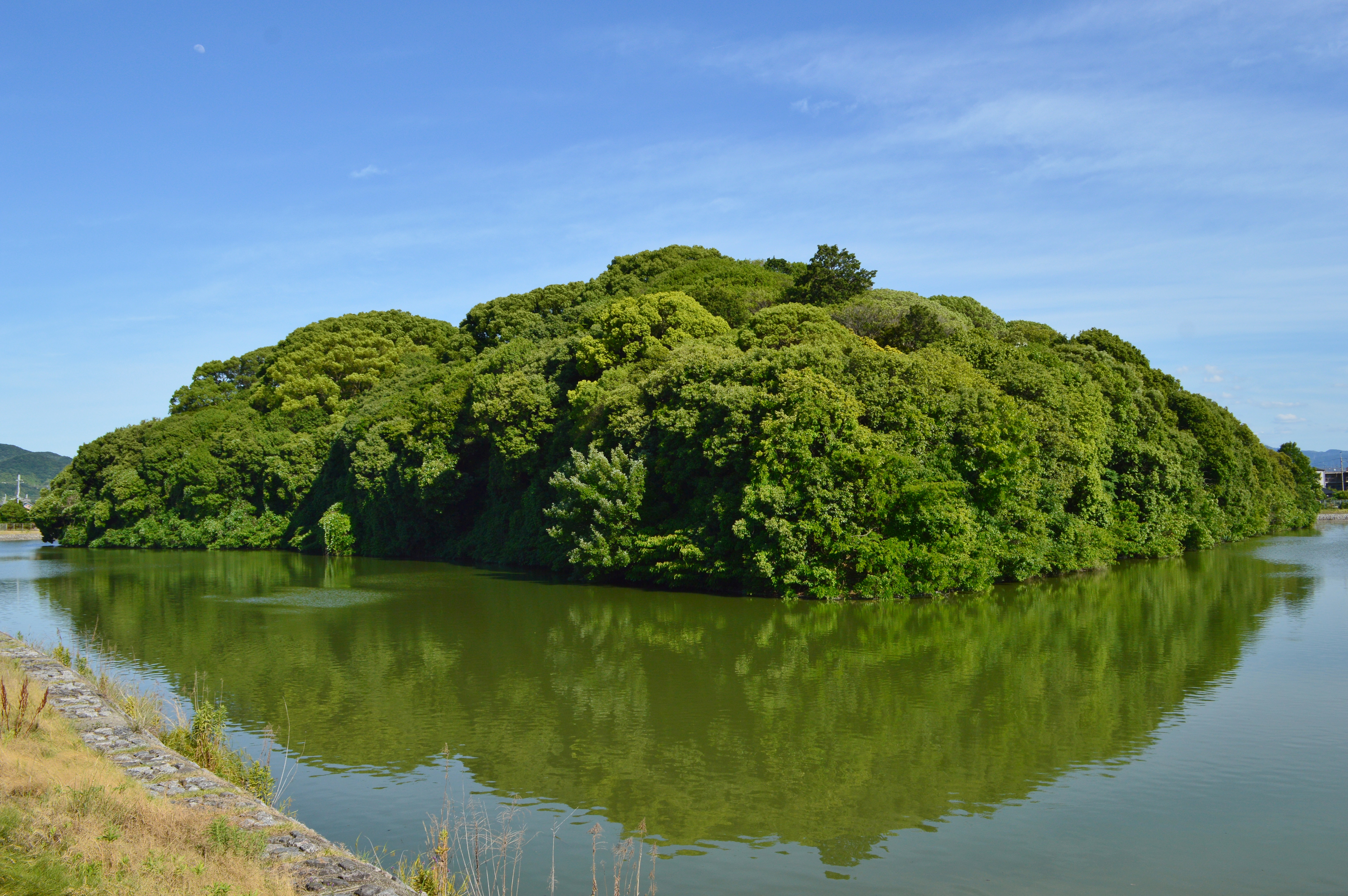
Karusato Otsuka Kofun

List of major kofun
Name	Name	Type	Length	National Historic Site	Imperial Household Agency	World Heritage Site & Comments
Kondayama Kofun	誉田御廟山古墳（誉田山古墳）	keyhole	425m	NHS	Emperor Ojin	WHS
Nakatsuyama Kofun	仲ツ山古墳（仲津山古墳）	keyhole	290m	NHS	Nakatsu-hime	WHS
Okamisanzai Kofun	岡ミサンザイ古墳	keyhole	242m		Emperor Chūai	WHS
Ichinoyama Kofun	市ノ山古墳（市野山古墳）	keyhole	230m		Emperor Ingyō	WHS
Hakayama Kofun	墓山古墳	keyhole	225m	NHS	Emperor Ōjin baichō	WHS
Tsudoshiroyama Kofun	津堂城山古墳	keyhole	210m	NHS	Fujiidera Tomb Reference Site	WHS
Karusato Ozuka Kofun	軽里大塚古墳（前の山古墳/白鳥陵古墳）	keyhole	200m	NHS	Yamato Takeru	WHS
Nonakamiyayama Kofun	野中宮山古墳	keyhole	154m			
Komuroyama Kofun	古室山古墳	keyhole	150m	NHS		WHS
Nonaka Bokeyama Kofun	野中ボケ山古墳	keyhole	122m		Emperor Ninken	
Takayatsukiyama	高屋築山古墳	keyhole	122m		Emperor Ankan	
Shirahigeyama Kofun	白髪山古墳	keyhole	115m		Emperor Seinei	
Otorizuka Kofun	大鳥塚古墳	keyhole	110m	NHS		WHS
Futatsuzuka Kofun	二ツ塚古墳	keyhole	110m		Emperor Ōjin baichō	WHS
Hazamiyama Kofun	はざみ山古墳	keyhole	103m	NHS		WHS
Minegazuka Kofun	峯ヶ塚古墳	keyhole	96m	NHS		WHS
Takaya Hachimanyama Kofun	高屋八幡山古墳	keyhole	90m		Kasuga-no-Yamada himemiko	
Shimaizumi Maruyama Kofun	島泉丸山古墳]]	circular	75m		Emperor Yūryaku	
Nabezuka Kofun	鍋塚古墳	square	70m	NHS		WHS
Mukohakayama Kofun	向墓山古墳]]	square	68m		Emperor Ōjin baichō	WHS
Jōgenjiyama Kofun	浄元寺山古墳	square	67m	NHS		WHS
Aoyama Kofun	青山古墳	round	62m	NHS		WHS
Hachizuka Kofun	鉢塚古墳	keyhole	60m	NHS		WHS
Karatoyama Kofun	唐櫃山古墳	scallop	59m	NHS		
Inarizuka Kofun	稲荷塚古墳	scallop	50m	NHS		
Higashiyama Kofun	東山古墳	square	50m	NHS		WHS
Yajimazuka Kofun	八島塚古墳	square	50m		Nakatsu-hime baichō	WHS, one of the "Mitsuzuka Kofun)
Nakayamazuka Kofun	中山塚古墳	square	50m		Nakatsu-hime baichō	WHS, one of the "Mitsuzuka Kofun)
Shimaizumihirazuka Kofun	島泉平塚古墳]]	square	50m		Emperor Yūryaku	
Kondamaruyama Kofun	誉田丸山古墳	circular	50m		Emperor Ōjin baichō	WHS
Koshirahigeyama Kofun	小白髪山古墳	keyhole	46m		Emperor Seinen baichō	
Nishi Umazuka Kofun	西馬塚古墳	square	45m		Emperor Ōjin baichō	WHS
Awazuka Kofun	栗塚古墳	square	43m		Emperor Ōjin baichō	WHS
Miya-no-minamizuka Kofun	宮の南塚古墳	circular	40m		Emperor Ingyō baichō	
Nonaka Kofun	野中古墳	square	37m	NHS		WHS
Suketayama Kofun	助太山古墳	square	36m	NHS	Nakatsu-hime baichō	WHS, one of the "Mitsuzuka Kofun
Warizuka Kofun	割塚古墳	square	30m	NHS		
Sandoyama Kofun	サンド山古墳		30m?		Emperor Ōjin baichō	
Higashi Umazuka Kofun	東馬塚古墳	square	23m		Emperor Ōjin baichō	WHS
Banshoyama Kofun	蕃所山古墳	circular	22m	NHS		
Matsukawazuka Kofun	松川塚古墳	square	20m	NHS		
Hayatozuka Kofun	隼人塚古墳]]	square	20m		Emperor Yūryaku baichō	
Nonoue Kofun	野々上古墳	square	20m		Emperor Ninken baichō	
Inuizuka Kofun	衣縫塚古墳	circular	20m		Emperor Ingyō baichō	
Sekimenyama Kofun	赤面山古墳	square	15m	NHS		

The Mozu Kofun Group is located about 10 kilometers to the west.

== See also ==
- Kofun
- Mozu Kofun Group
- List of Historic Sites of Japan (Osaka)
- List of National Treasures of Japan (archaeological materials)
- Buried Cultural Properties
- World Heritage Sites in Japan
