= Gaya Tumuli =

UNESCO World Heritage Site in South Korea

UNESCO World Heritage Site
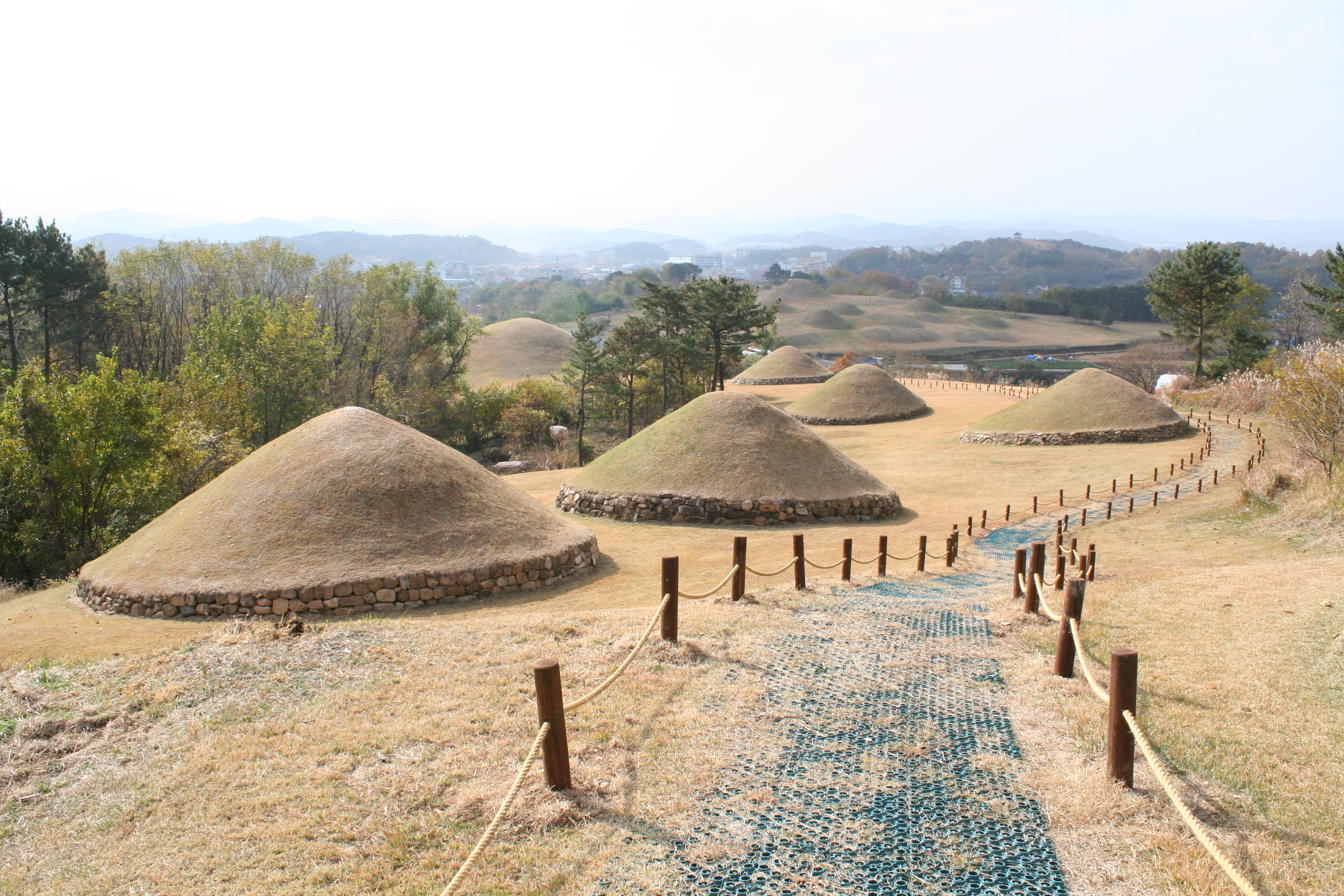
- Gaya Tumuli in Changnyeong
- Interactive map of Gaya Tumuli
- Location: South Korea
- Criteria: Cultural: (iii)
- Reference: 1666
- Inscription: 2023 (45th Session)

Gaya Tumuli (Korean: 가야고분군) comprises seven tumuli complexes of the Gaya confederacy, from the 1st to the late 6th century CE. In 2023, seven tumuli complexes in South Korea were listed as a UNESCO World Heritage Site.

== List ==
Gaya Tumuli
UNESCO ID	English name	Korean name	Location	Picture	Note
1666-001	Daeseong-dong Tumuli	대성동 고분군	Gimhae, South Gyeongsang Province		
1666-002	Marisan Tumuli	말이산 고분군	Haman County, South Gyeongsang Province		
1666-003	Okjeon Tumul	옥전 고분군	Hapcheon County, South Gyeongsang Province		
1666-004	Jisan-dong Tumuli	지산동 고분군	Goryeong County, North Gyeongsang Province		
1666-005	Songhak-dong Tumuli	송학동 고분군	Goseong County, South Gyeongsang Province		
1666-006	Yugok-ri and Durak-ri Tumuli	유곡리와 두락리 고분군	Namwon, North Jeolla Province		
1666-007	Gyo-dong and Songhyeon-dong Tumuli	교동과 송현동 고분군	Changnyeong County, South Gyeongsang Province		
