= Mozu Kofun Group =

Megalithic tombs in Japan

Mozu Kofun Group 百舌鳥古墳群
- Sakai, Osaka Prefecture, Japan
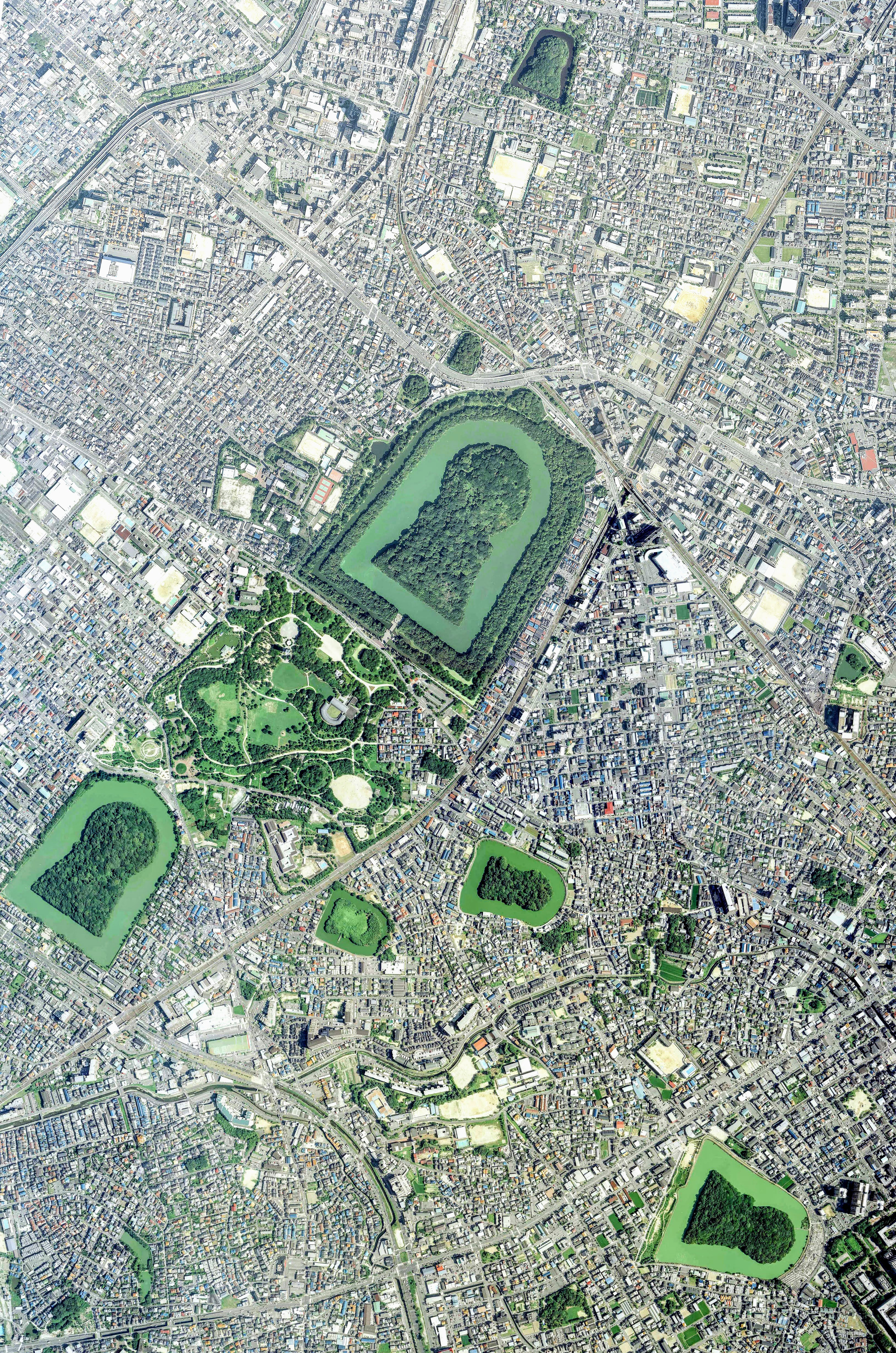
- Area around Mozu Kofun Group; Created based on aerial photographs from the Japan Geospatial Information Authority of the Ministry of Land, Infrastructure, Transport and Tourism's map and aerial photo browsing service.

Site information
- Owner: Imperial Household Agency
- Condition: Intact

Location
- Location within Japan
- Coordinates: 34.564°N 135.487°E

Site history
- Built: 3rd to 6th century

UNESCO World Heritage Site
- Criteria: Cultural: iii, iv
- Reference: 1593
- Inscription: 2019 (43rd Session)
- Area: 166.6 ha (412 acres)
- Buffer zone: 890 ha (2,200 acres)
- National Historic Site of Japan

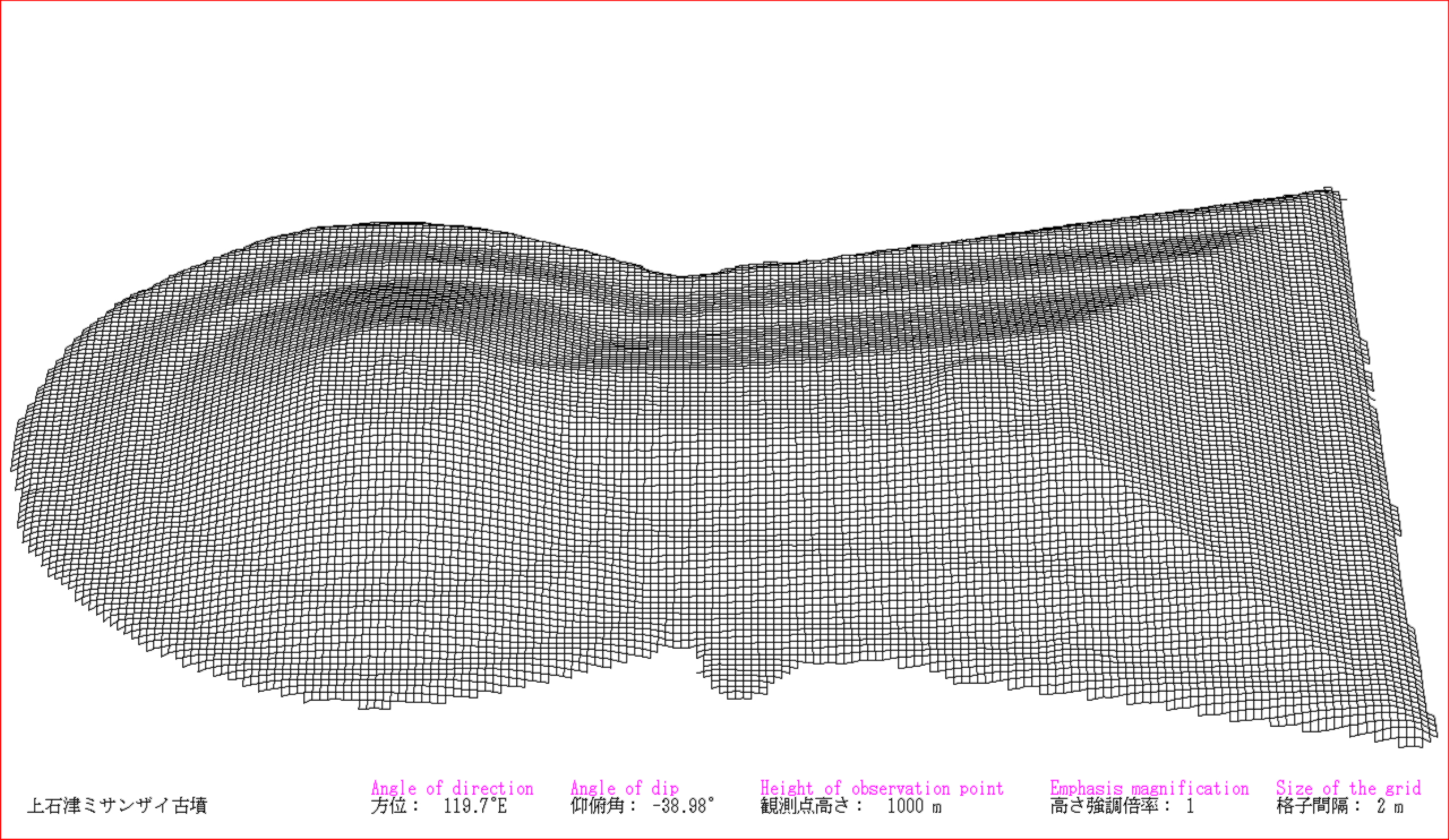
Kamiishizu Misanzai Kofun (Tomb of Emperor Richū) which was drawn in 3DCG. This is a kofun of the second size in the group.

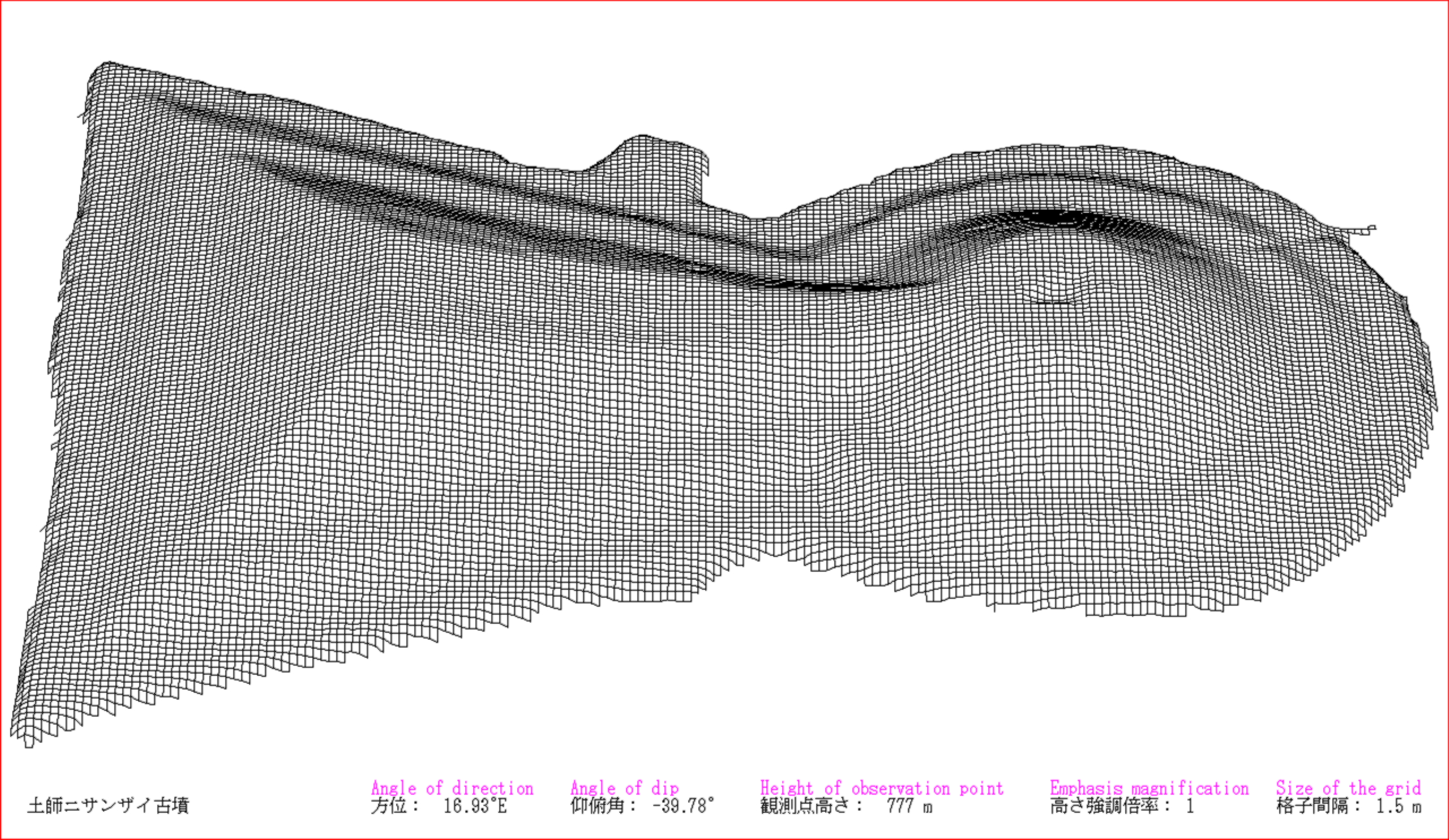
Haze Nisanzai Kofun which was drawn in 3DCG. This is a kofun of the third size in the group.

The Mozu Kofun Group (百舌鳥古墳群, Mozu Kofun-gun) is a group of kofun—megalithic tombs—in Sakai, Osaka Prefecture, Japan. Originally consisting of more than 100 tombs, fewer than 50% of the key-hole, round, and rectangular tombs remain.

The Daisenryo Kofun (大仙陵古墳, Daisenryō kofun), the largest kofun in Japan, is believed to have been constructed over a period of 20 years in the mid 5th century during the Kofun Period. While it cannot be accurately confirmed, it is commonly accepted that the tomb was built for the late Emperor Nintoku. The Imperial Household Agency of Japan treats it as such.

== Location ==
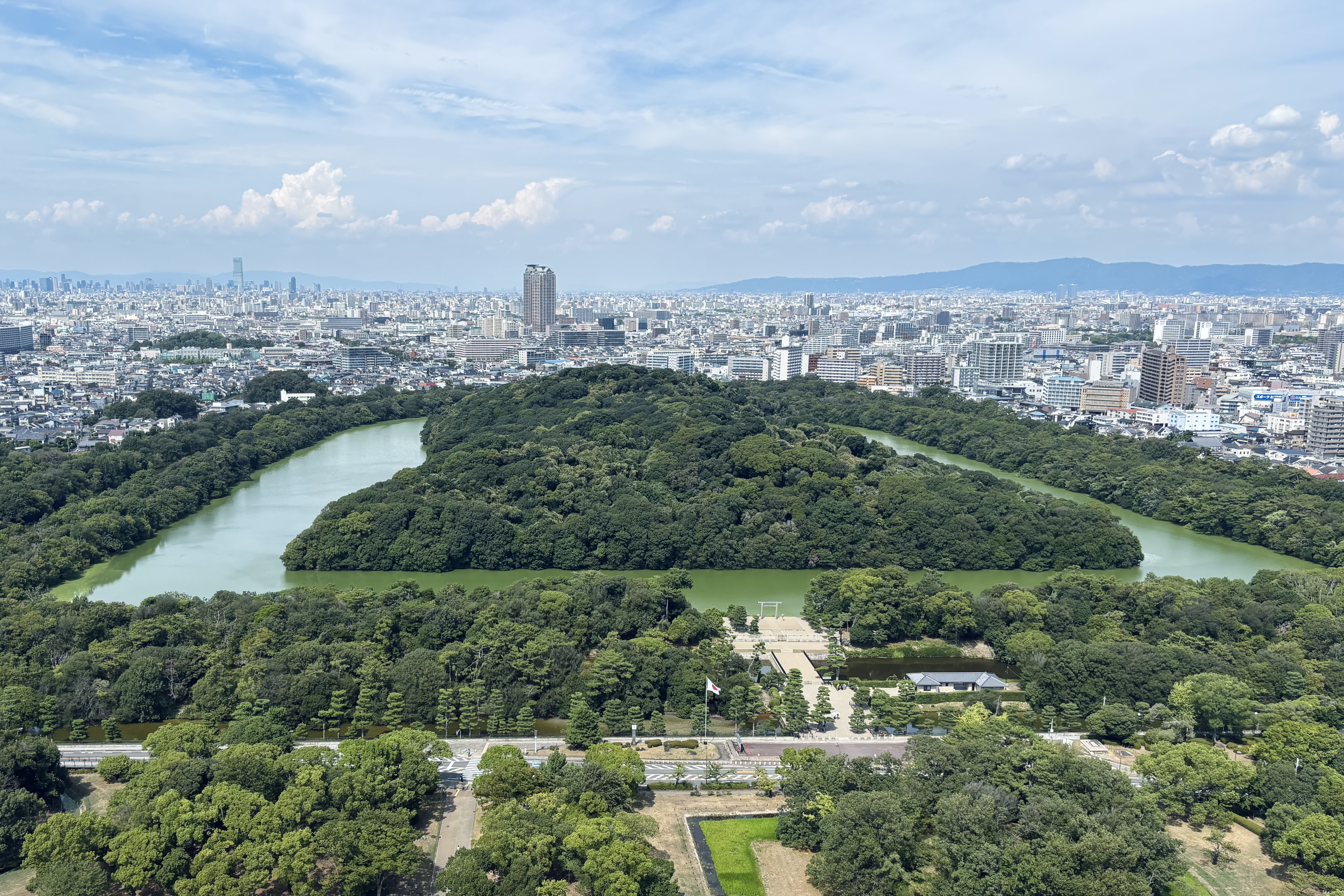

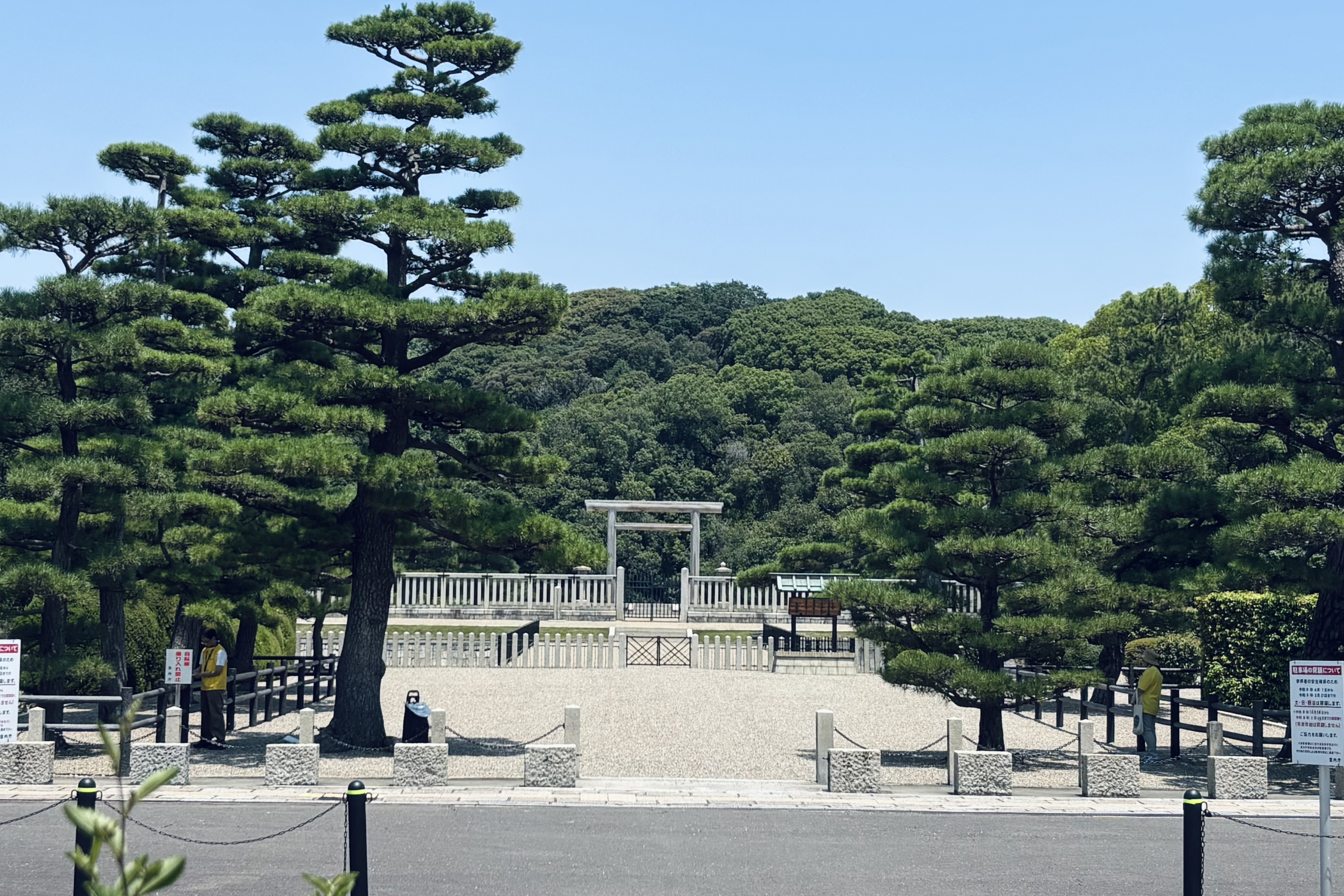
Daisenryo Kofun

The Mozu Kofun Group is located in the city of Sakai which is within Osaka Prefecture. The tumuli are built on a plateau overlooking Osaka Bay near the ancient coastline and are distributed in a range of about four kilometers from east-to-west and north-to-south. The Furuichi Kofun Cluster is located in nearby Habikino and Fujiidera cities.

== History ==
In the Japanese archipelago, more than 20,000 tumuli (kofun), which are mounds of earth and stones erected over graves of the ruling class, were built between the later part of the 3rd century and the 6th century. It was the peak period of building such mounds. They represent a cultural tradition which is an expression of "forms, and design of the kofun" of the sociopolitical hierarchical order and the link that was prevalent during that period between regions. This period is termed as the Kofun Period. The most prominent imperial mausolea in this cluster of tumuli are those of Emperor Nintoku and Emperor Richū.

There are 44 burial mounds in the Mozu Group, including those that are partially destroyed. Of these, 19 have been designated as national historic sites, and separately, the Imperial Household Agency has ruled three to be Imperial mausoleums, two to be "Tomb Reference Sites", and 18 to be "baichō", or ancillary mausoleums connected with an Imperial mausoleum. There used to be more than 100 burial mounds, but due to the rapid development of residential land after World War II, more than half of the burial mounds were destroyed.

In 2010, the Japanese government proposed that the Daisen Kofun and the entire cluster of Mozu Kofun Group and Furuichi Kofun Group be designated as a UNESCO World Heritage Site. 9 years later on 6 July 2019, the site was approved and inscribed as a UNESCO World Heritage Site under Criteria: (iii) and (iv) as the Mozu-Furuichi Kofun Group: Mounded Tombs of Ancient Japan.

== Features ==
The kofun are found in many shapes and dimensions in varying patterns. Some are of simple circular or square shape (empun and hōfun). The larger ones are keyhole-shaped (zempō kōenfun); they represent the highest class of kofun and were built in great detail. The three prominent aspects of these kofun are their massive size and being surrounded by several moats and many secondary kofun.

In the Osaka Plain and Nara Basin, which were the cultural centre of the Kofun Period, the rounded keyhole-shaped tombs were built extending to very large lengths, out of which the Mozu-Furuichi Kofun Group is the most prominent. These are in two kofun groups which are dated to the later part of 4th and early part of 6th centuries. These kofun are of the largest dimensions in the country. The Nintoku-tennō-ryō Kofun, is one grave mound which is a 486 metres (1,594 ft) long tumulus enclosed by a moat and a fortification which is 840 metres (2,760 ft) in length; this is said to be the largest such mound in the world. This cluster also has the Richū-tennō-ryō Kofun, made of a tumulus of 360 metres (1,180 ft) length and said to be the third largest in the country.

Another group of mounds, located about 10 kilometres (6.2 mi) away from the Mozu Kofun Group is known as the Furuichi Kofun Group. It has the Ōjin-tennō-ryō Kofun of 425 metres (1,394 ft) length which is said to be the second largest in the country. This group also has 11 more huge massive rounded "keyhole-shaped kofun" with mound length of 200 metres (660 ft) or more.

A feature of these funerary mounds is that they contain – along with the buried people – grave goods made of iron, weapons worn by individuals including arrowheads, swords, hoe and spade tips, and many other similar items. Also found in the mounds are antiquities made of gilded bronze such as horse tacks and sash buckles.

The Daisen Kofun mound is approximately 500 metres (1,600 ft) long and 300 metres (980 ft) across at its widest point, while the entire tomb area is 840 metres (2,760 ft) long. Enclosed by three moats, the mound rises approximately 35m above the surrounding terrain. The highest point is 47 metres (154 ft), making it visible to the seafarers in nearby Osaka Bay. The inner moat is the widest of the moats at approximately 60 metres (200 ft). The mound is approximately 100,000 square metres (1,100,000 sq ft) in area, and the entire tomb is 460,000 square metres (5,000,000 sq ft).

Today, the tomb is off-limits and protected by the Imperial Household Agency in the centre of Sakai City. The moats have been maintained and provide a sanctuary for fish and waterbirds. The mound itself is completely overgrown by vegetation. A viewing platform from the second (middle) moat is accessible at the south side of the site. The viewing platform is 500m away from Mozu Station on the Hanwa Line and is directly across the street from the Sakai City Museum. This museum provides visitors with information about the kofun and its history.

=== Gallery ===
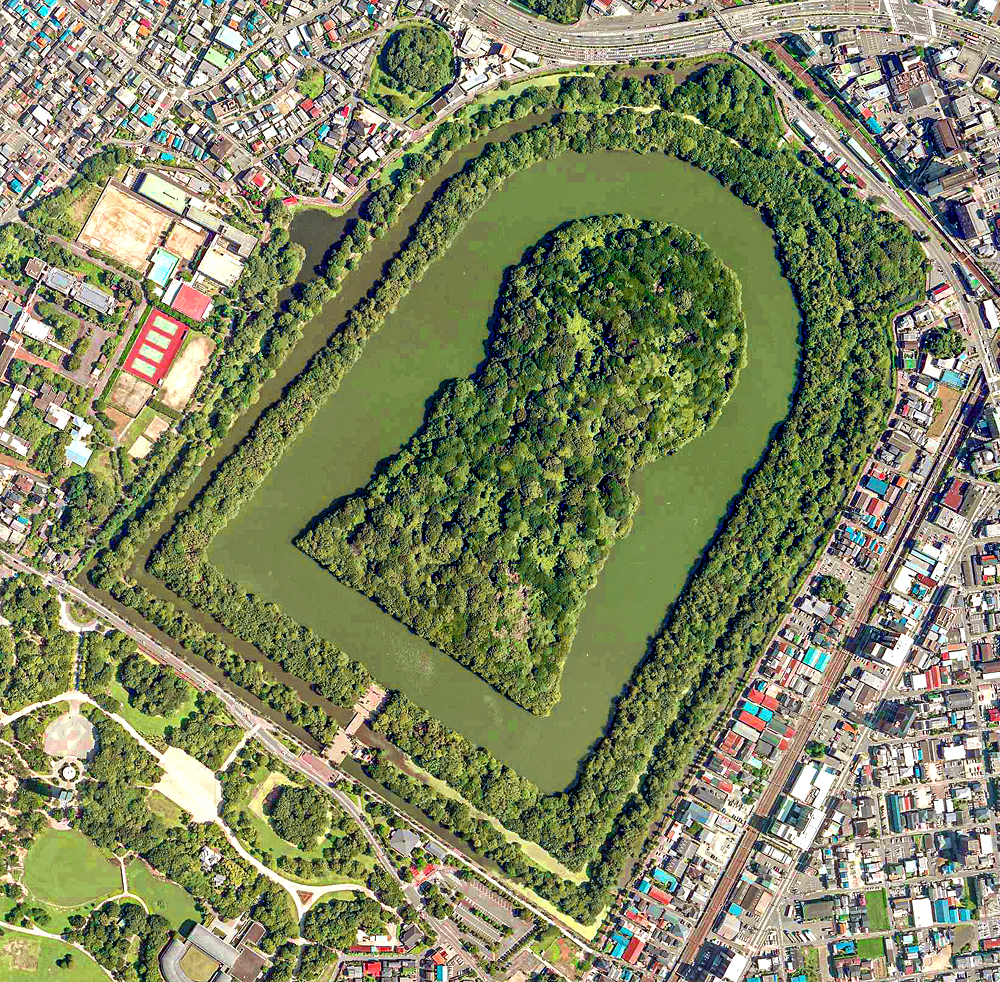
Daisenryo Kofun, 2.8 km in circumference and the largest kofun in Japan, is thought to be the Tomb of Emperor Nintoku.

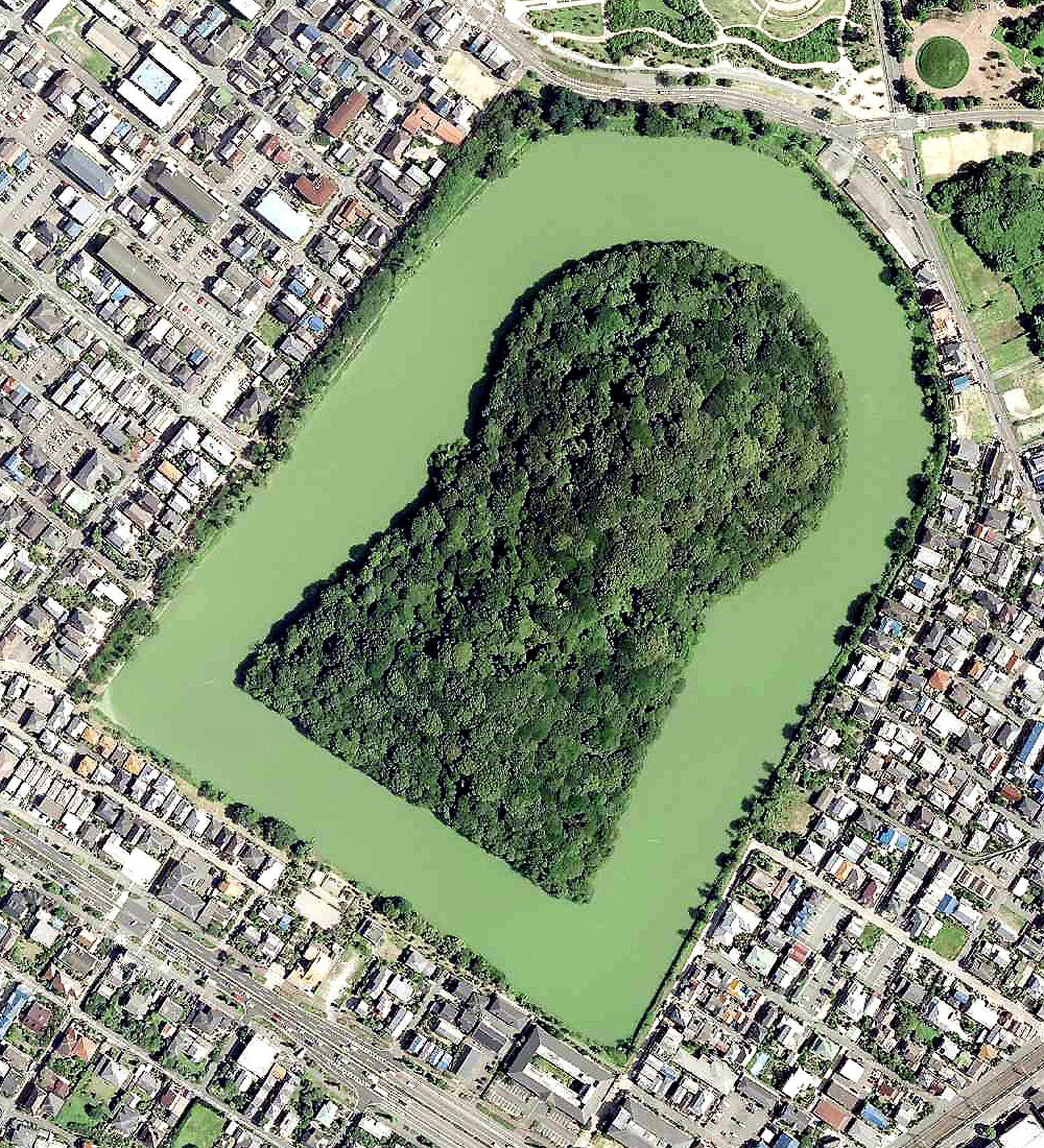
Kamiishizu Misanzai Kofun

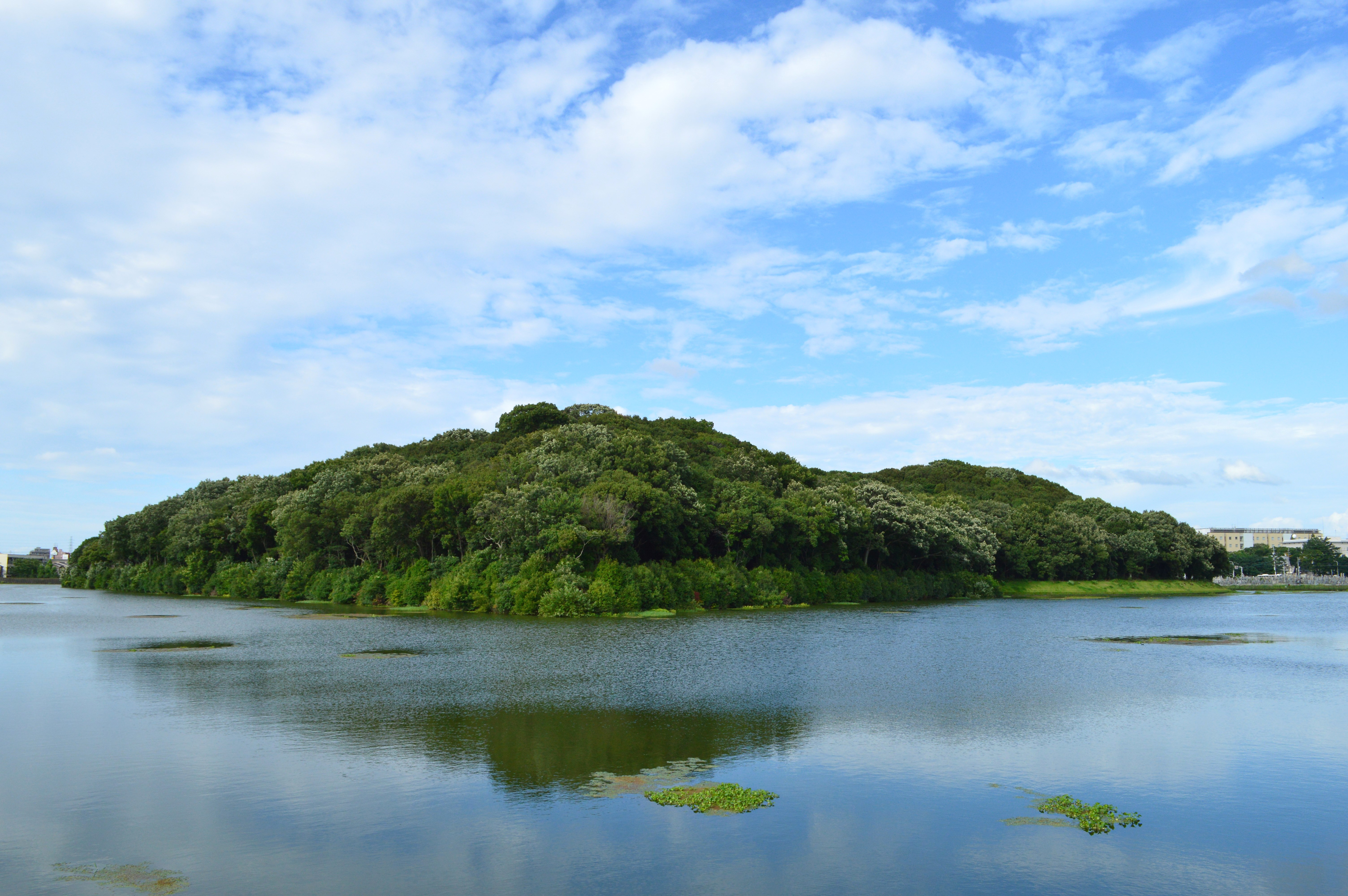
Haze Nisanzai Kofun

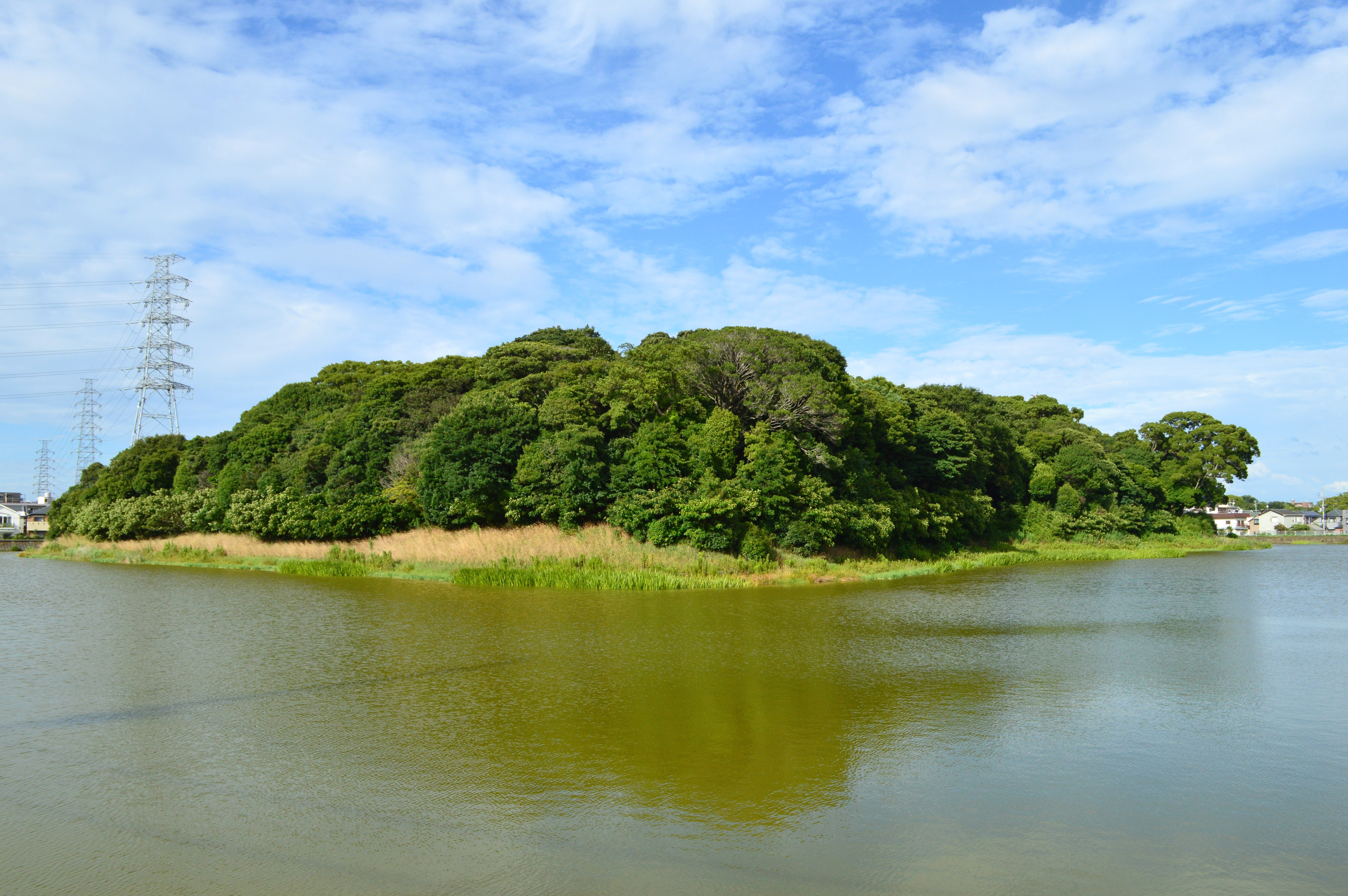
Mozu Gobyo-yama Kofun

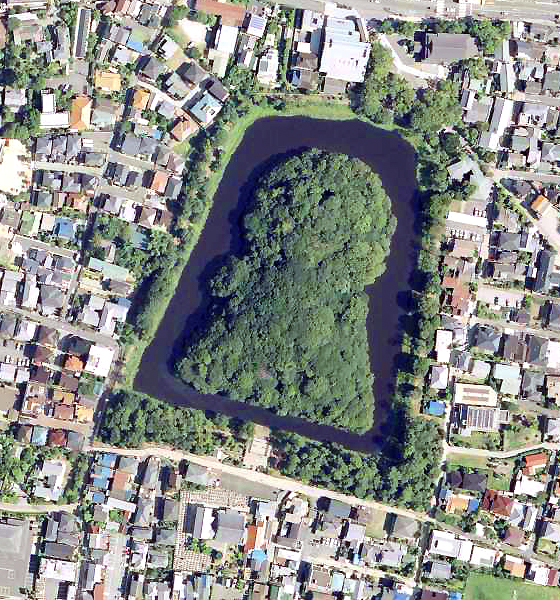
Tadeiyama Kofun

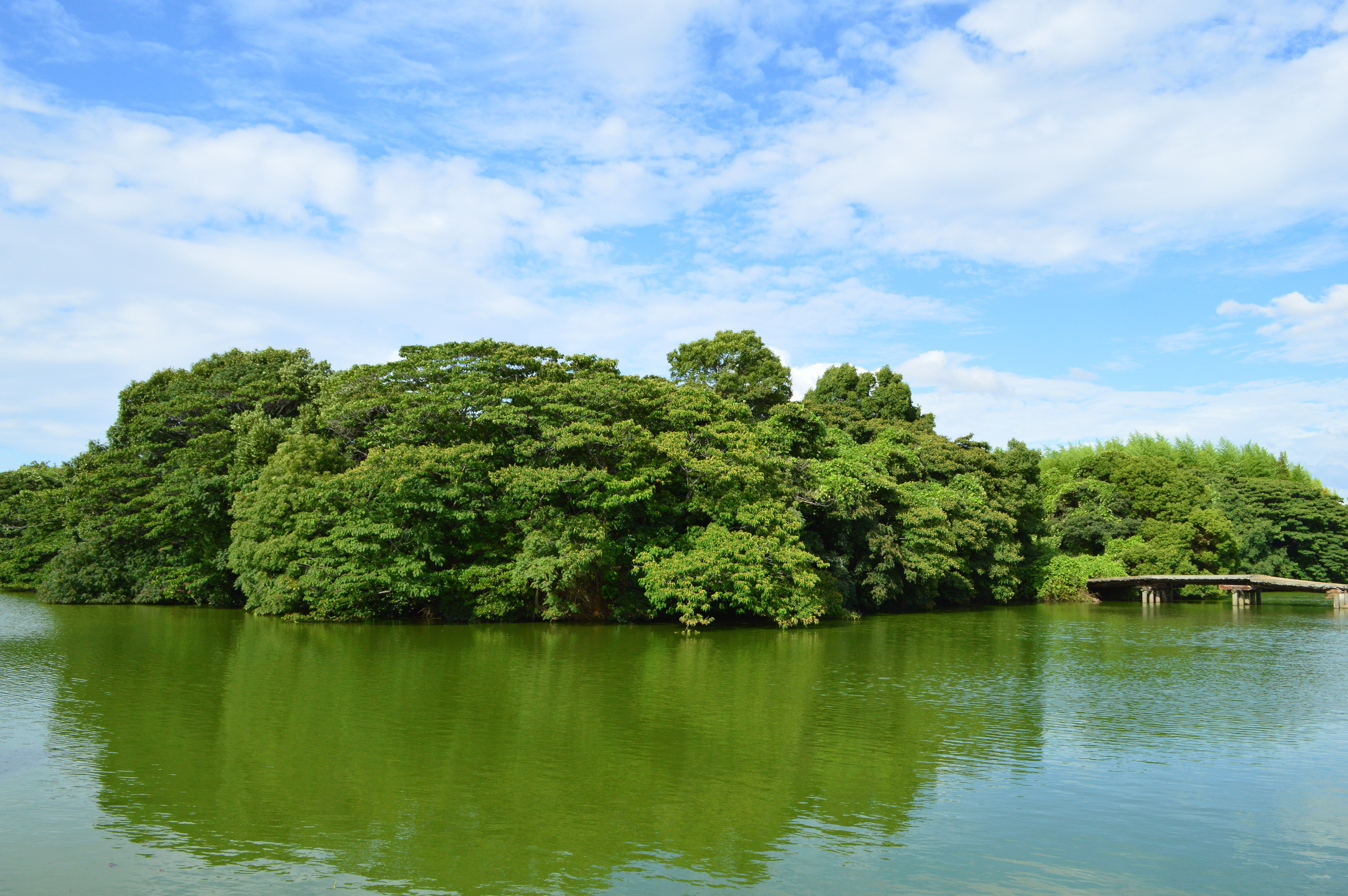
Itasuke Kofun

List of major kofun
Name	Name	Location	Type	Length	National Historic Site	Imperial Household Agency	World Heritage Site & Comments
Daisenryō Kofun	大仙陵古墳	Sakai-ku, Sakai	keyhole	525 m		Emperor Nintoku	WHS
Kamiishizumisanzai Kofun	上石津ミサンザイ古墳	Nishi-ku, Sakai	keyhole	365 m		Emperor Richū	WHS
Hazenisanzai Kofun	土師ニサンザイ古墳	Nishi-ku, Sakai	keyhole	290 m	NHS	East Mozu Reference Site	WHS
Kobyōyama Kofun	御廟山古墳	Kita-ku, Sakai	keyhole	203 m	NHS	Mozu Reference Site	WHS
Chin'ooka Kofun	乳岡古墳	Sakai-ku, Sakai	keyhole	155 m	NHS		
Tadeiyama Kofun	田出井山古墳	Sakai-ku, Sakai	keyhole	148 m		Emperor Hanzei	WHS
Itasuke Kofun	いたすけ古墳	Kita-ku, Sakai	keyhole	146 m	NHS		WHS
Nagatsuka Kofun	長塚古墳	Sakai-ku, Sakai	keyhole	106 m	NHS		WHS
Nagayama Kofun	永山古墳	Sakai-ku, Sakai	keyhole	100 m	Sakai city HS	Emperor Nintoku baichō	WHS
Maruhoyama Kofun	丸保山古墳	Sakai-ku, Sakai	Scallop	87 m	NHS	Emperor Nintoku baichō	WHS
Gobyō-Omotezuka Kofun	御廟表塚古墳	Kita-ku, Sakai	keyhole	85 m	NHS		
Zenizuka Kofun	銭塚古墳	Sakai-ku, Sakai	Scallop	72 m	NHS		WHS
Jōnoyama Kofun	定の山古墳	Kita-ku, Sakai	Scallop	69 m			
Daianjiyama Kofun	大安寺山古墳	Sakai-ku, Sakai	circular	62 m		Emperor Nintoku baichō	WHS
Tatsusayama Kofun	竜佐山古墳	Sakai-ku, Sakai	Scallop	61 m	Sakai city HS）	Emperor Nintoku baichō	WHS
Guwashobō Kofun	グワショウ坊古墳	Sakai-ku, Sakai	circular	61 m	NHS		
Monjuzuka Kofun	文珠塚古墳	Nishi-ku, Sakai	keyhole	59 m	NHS		
Osamezuka Kofun	収塚古墳	Sakai-ku, Sakai	Scallop	58 m	NHS		WHS
Hatazuka Kofun	旗塚古墳	Kita-ku, Sakai	Scallop	58 m	NHS		WHS
Chayama Kofun	茶山古墳	Sakai-ku, Sakai	circular	56 m		Emperor Nintoku baichō	WHS
Magodaiyūyama Kofun	孫太夫山古墳	Sakai-ku, Sakai	Scallop	56 m		Emperor Nintoku baichō	WHS
Kabutozuka Kofun	かぶと塚古墳	Nishi-ku, Sakai	Scallop	50 m			
Hinotani Kofun	樋の谷古墳	Sakai-ku, Sakai	circular	47 m		Emperor Nintoku baichō	
Terayama Minamiyama Kofun	寺山南山古墳	Nishi0ku, Sakai	square	45 m	NHS		WHS
Genemonyama Kofun	源右衛門山古墳	Sakai-ku, Sakai	circular	34 m		Emperor Nintoku baichō	WHS
Chinjuyama Kofun	鎮守山塚古墳	Kita-ku, Sakai	circular	34 m			
Komoyamazuka Kofun	菰山塚古墳	Sakai-ku, Sakai	Scallop	33 m		Emperor Nintoku baichō	WHS
Shichikannon Kofun	七観音古墳	Sakai-ku, Sakai	circular	33 m	NHS		WHS
Tsukamawari Kofun	塚廻古墳	Sakai-ku, Sakai	circular	32 m	NHS		WHS
Kitsuneyama Kofun	狐山古墳	Sakai-ku, Sakai	circular	30 m		Emperor Nintoku baichō	
Zan'emonyama Kofun	善右ヱ門山古墳	Kita-ku, Sakai	square	28 m	NHS		WHS
Kagamizuka Kofun	鏡塚古墳	Kita-ku, Sakai	circular	26 m	NHS		
Dōgameyama Kofun	銅亀山古墳	Sakai-ku, Sakai	square	26 m		Emperor Nintoku baichō	WHS
Donchayama Kofun	ドンチャ山古墳	Kita-ku, Sakai	circular	26 m	NHS		
Mozuyama Kofun	万代山古墳	Kita-ku, Sakai	keyhole	25 m+			
Nishisakenomi Kofun	西酒呑古墳	Sakai-ku, Sakai	circular	25 m		Emperor Richū baichō	
Hinokizuka Kofun	桧塚古墳	Sakai-ku, Sakai	keyhole	25 m		Emperor Richū baichō	
Suzuyama Kofun	鈴山古墳	Sakai-ku, Sakai	square	22 m		Emperor Hanzei baichō	
Higashisakenomi Kofun	東酒呑古墳	Sakai-ku, Sakai	circular	21 m		Emperor Richū baichō	
Kyōdō Kofun	経堂古墳	Sakai-ku, Sakai	circular	20 m		Emperor Richū baichō	
Shorakujiyama Kofun	正楽寺山古墳	Kita-ku, Sakai	circular	16 m	NHS		
Tennō Kofun	天王古墳	Sakai-ku, Sakai	square	11 m		Emperor Hanzei baichō	
Hōzuyama Kofun	坊主山古墳	Kita-ku, Sakai	circular	10 m		Emperor Nintoku baichō	
Higashi Ueno Shibamachi No. 1 Kofun	東上野芝町1号墳	Sakai-ku, Sakai	circular				

== See also ==
- Buried Cultural Properties
- List of Historic Sites of Japan (Osaka)
- List of National Treasures of Japan (archaeological materials)
- World Heritage Sites in Japan
- Japanese imperial tombs

== Bibliography ==
- Fawcett, Clare P. (1990). A study of the socio-political context of Japanese archaeology. McGill University, Montréal.
