= 450s =

Decade

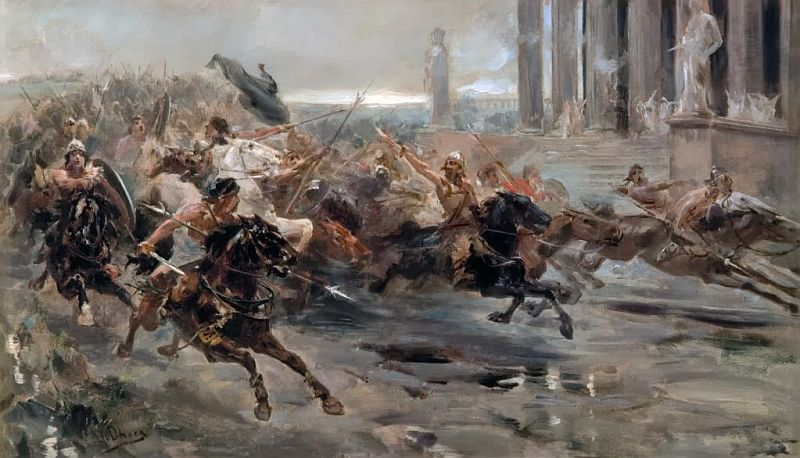
A painting of the Huns approaching Rome during the 450s

The 450s decade ran from January 1, 450, to December 31, 459.

== Events ==
=== 450 ===
==== By place ====
====== Byzantium ======
- July 28 – Emperor Theodosius II, age 49, falls from his horse while hunting at Constantinople and dies soon afterward. He has reigned since 408, mostly under the domination of his Christian sister Pulcheria, who has been allowed to return to court (see 441).
- August 25 – Pulcheria is forced to marry and co-rule the Eastern Roman Empire. She gives the imperial diadem to the Illyrian (or Thracian) officer and senator Marcian, age 58, and is crowned as empress in the Hippodrome at Constantinople, in the first religious coronation ceremony.
- Marcian orders the execution (or assassination) of the unpopular court eunuch Chrysaphius. He discontinues the tribute payments to Attila.
- All the Temples of Aphrodisias (City of Goddess Aphrodite) are demolished and its libraries burned down. The city is renamed Stauroupolis (City of the Cross).

====== Europe ======
- Spring – Justa Grata Honoria, eldest sister of emperor Valentinian III, sends her ring to Attila the Hun in an effort to escape a marriage being forced upon her by her brother. Now about 34, she has had an affair with an officer in her household and has allegedly plotted to overthrow Valentinian, who has sent her to a convent at Constantinople. Attila announces his intention to marry her, says he expects to be given half the Western Roman Empire as her dowry, and gathers a large Hun invasion force. Flavius Aetius, Roman general (magister militum), musters an army in Gaul of Burgundians, Celts, Ripuarians, Salian Franks and Visigoths under the command of the Visigoth king Theodoric I.
- Angles, Saxons and Jutes invade Britain, marking the beginning of the Old English period (approximate date).
- Remodelling of the Dome of Baptistry of Neon, Ravenna (Italy) begins (approximate date).

====== Persia ======
- King Yazdegerd II summons the leading Armenian nobles to the Persian capital Ctesiphon, pressuring them to cut their ties with the Western Church.

====== Asia ======
- Nalanda University (India) is founded (approximate date).

==== By topic ====
====== Agriculture ======
- Metal horseshoes come into more common use in the Near East and in Europe, increasing the efficiency of horsepower in agriculture and transportation.

=== 451 ===
==== By place ====
====== Europe ======
- Spring – Attila gathers his vassals—Bastarnae, Gepids, Heruls, Ostrogoths, Rugians, Scirians and Thuringians (among others), and smashes through Germany, causing widespread panic and destruction. He arrives in Belgica with an army (50,000 men) and crosses the Rhine.
- April 7 – Attila's forces invade Gaul and sack Metz. The major cities of Strasbourg, Worms, Mainz, Trier, Cologne, Reims, Tournai, Cambrai, Amiens and Beauvais are destroyed by the Huns.
- Eudocia, daughter of Emperor Valentinian III, marries Huneric in Ravenna. The engagement serves to strengthen the alliance between the Western Roman Empire and the Vandal Kingdom.
- June – Attila approaches Aurelianum (modern Orléans) and the city's inhabitants close the gates, forcing him to lay siege. After learning of the Hun invasion, Flavius Aetius (magister militum) moves quickly from Italy into Gaul, and joins forces with Visigoth king Theodoric I.
- June 20 – Battle of the Catalaunian Plains (Châlons): Attila avoids a pitched battle near Orléans, and withdraws to the Catalaunian Plains (Champagne-Ardenne). The Roman coalition defeats the Huns, but Theodoric I is killed in the encounter. This is one of the last military victories of the Western Roman Empire, before the victories of Emperor Majorian against the Alemanni, Visigoths, Suebi and Burgundians, between 457 and 461.
- Thorismund succeeds his father Theodoric I as king of the Visigoths. He is crowned in the capital at Toulouse, and extends the Visigothic Kingdom in Hispania.

====== Persia ======
- May 26 – Battle of Vartanantz: King Yazdegerd II defeats the Armenian army (66,000 men) under their rebel leader Vartan Mamikonian on the Avarayr Plain (Armenia). Despite the loss of Mamikonian, who is killed, the Armenians consider this battle to have been a moral and religious victory, since Yazdegerd, out of respect for their efforts, allows them to remain Christian. The anniversary is a national and religious holiday.
- Yazdegerd II issues a decree to abolish the Shabbat, and orders the execution of Jewish leaders, including the Exilarch.

==== By topic ====
====== Religion ======
- October 8 – November 1 – Council of Chalcedon, an ecumenical council of the Church: The monophysitism of Eutyches is repudiated, and the Chalcedonian Definition set forth. As a result of this council, the Oriental Orthodox Churches eventually become a separate communion. More immediately, Jerusalem becomes a Patriarchate, and Dioscorus of Alexandria is deposed as Patriarch of Alexandria by the Council.

=== 452 ===
==== By place ====
====== Europe ======
- The Huns under Attila invade Northern Italy. Emperor Valentinian III flees from Ravenna to Rome, and sends Pope Leo I to persuade Attila to return to the Hungarian Plain. The cities of Aquileia, Padua and Verona are destroyed by the Huns. Milan is saved because Attila is offered a huge amount of gold. Flavius Aetius (magister militum) is unable to raise a new army against him.
- Rome is threatened by Attila but not attacked, due to a last-minute effort by Leo I. Threatened by news of reinforcements from the Eastern Roman Empire and the plague breaking out among the Huns, Attila is persuaded to withdraw.
- The city of Venice is founded by fugitives from Attila's army who flee to small islands in the Venetian Lagoon.
- King Vortigern marries Hengist's daughter, Rowena, and becomes king of the Britons. The Anglo-Saxons increase their settlements in Britain (according to British legend).

====== China ======
- Nan'an Yinwang succeeds his father Emperor Taiwu of Northern Wei, after he is assassinated by the eunuch Zong Ai. Later this year, Yinwang is murdered as well, and Ai is overthrown by a group of high officials. Wencheng Di, age 12, becomes the new emperor of Northern Wei.

=== 453 ===
==== By place ====
====== Byzantium ======
- July – Empress Pulcheria dies of natural causes at Constantinople. She has commissioned many new churches in the city during her reign. Her death leaves Flavius Aspar (magister militum) as the dominant influence on her husband, Marcian.
- Anthemius marries Marcia Euphemia, daughter of Marcian, and is elevated to the rank of comes. He is sent to the Danubian frontier to rebuild the border defences.

====== Europe ======
- c. March – Attila the Hun is found dead in bed, after a wedding feast with the Goth princess Ildico. He dies of a nosebleed at his Hungarian stronghold, drowning in his own blood, aged about 47. The Huns celebrate a strava (lamentation) over his burial place with great feasting. Attila's son Ellac is appointed successor, but his brothers Dengizich and Ernakh divide the Hunnic Empire by establishing their own kingdoms north of the Black Sea (Ukraine), supported by vassal states.
- Theodoric II succeeds his brother Thorismund as king of the Visigoths, Thorismund having been murdered after he violated the alliance with the Western Roman Empire.

====== Asia ======
- March 16 – Emperor Wen of Song is assassinated by his sons Liu Shao and Liu Jun, Prince Shixing, so that Liu Shao can become emperor.
- May 20 – Liu Shao is overthrown by another brother, Liu Jun who becomes Emperor Xiaowu of Song.
- May 27 – Liu Shao is executed, together with other members of his family.
- Ankō obtains the throne of his father Ingyō after the traditional order of succession and becomes the 20th emperor of Japan. His eldest brother Prince Kinashi no Karu commits suicide after being accused of an incestuous relationship with his sister Karu no Ōiratsume (according to the Nihon Shoki).

=== 454 ===
==== By place ====
====== Roman Empire ======
- September 21 – Emperor Valentinian III stabs his commander-in-chief Flavius Aetius to death, during a meeting of the imperial council at Ravenna. He has accused Aetius of plotting against him to seize power. After his assassination, the Western Roman Empire has no effective defender against its hostile barbarian neighbors (Alans, Franks, Ostrogoths, Vandals and Visigoths).

====== Europe ======
- Battle of Nedao: Allied forces of subjected peoples (Gepids, Heruli, Ostrogoths, Rugii, Sciri and Suebi), under the leadership of King Ardaric, defeat the Huns under Ellac, eldest son of Attila the Hun, in Pannonia. Ellac is killed during the battle and succeeded by his brother Dengizich.
- Ardaric unites the Gepids with other Germanic tribes, and founds the Kingdom of the Gepids in the Pannonian Basin.
- The Vandals conquer Malta.
- Ireland: The Diocese of Clogher is erected.

=== 455 ===
==== By place ====
====== Roman Empire ======
- March 16 – Emperor Valentinian III, age 35, is assassinated by two Hunnic retainers of the late Flavius Aetius, while training with the bow on the Campus Martius (Rome), ending the Theodosian dynasty. His primicerius sacri cubiculi, Heraclius, is also murdered.
- March 17 – Petronius Maximus, former domesticus ("elite bodyguard") of Aetius, becomes (with support of the Roman Senate) emperor of the Western Roman Empire. He secures the throne by bribing officials of the imperial palace. Maximus consolidates his power by a forced marriage with Licinia Eudoxia, widow of Valentinian III.
- Maximus appoints Avitus, most trusted general, to the rank of magister militum and sends him on an embassy to Toulouse, to gain the support of the Visigoths. He elevates his son Palladius to Caesar and has him marry Eudocia, eldest daughter of Valentinian III.
- May 31 – Maximus is stoned to death by an angry mob while fleeing Rome. A widespread panic occurs when many citizens hear the news that the Vandals are plundering the Italian mainland.
- June 2 – Sack of Rome: King Genseric leads the Vandals into Rome, after he has promised Pope Leo I not to burn and plunder the city. Genseric sacks the city for a period of two weeks. Eudoxia and her daughters, Eudocia and Placidia, are taken hostage. The loot is sent to the harbour of Ostia and loaded into ships, from whence the Vandals depart and return to Carthage.
- July 9 – Avitus is proclaimed Roman emperor at Toulouse, and later recognised by the Gallic chiefs in Viernum (near Arles).
- September 21 – Avitus enters Rome with a Gallic army. He restores the imperial authority in Noricum (modern Austria) and leaves a Gothic force under Remistus, Visigoth general (magister militum), at Ravenna.
- The Ostrogoths conquer Pannonia and Dalmatia.

====== Britannia ======
- Battle of Aylesford: Prince Vortimer rebels against the pro-Anglo-Saxon policies of his father, Vortigern. He is defeated in the battle at Aylesford (Kent). Hengist and his son Oisc become king of Kent. Horsa and Catigern, brother of Vortimer, are killed. The Britons withdraw to London (according to the Anglo-Saxon Chronicle).

====== Asia ======
- Skandagupta succeeds Kumaragupta I as ruler of the Gupta Empire (India). During his reign he crushes the Hun invasion; however, the expense of the wars drains the empire's resources and contributes to its decline.
- Gaero becomes king of the Korean kingdom of Baekje.

====== Mesoamerica ======
- Earliest recorded date at Chichen Itza on the Yucatán Peninsula (Mexico) (approximate date).

==== By topic ====
====== Commerce ======
- Barter economy replaces organized trade as Romans and other citizens desert their towns for the countryside, where they will be less vulnerable to barbarian raids (approximate date).

====== Medicine ======
- The city of Vindobona (Vienna) is struck by an epidemic that spreads through the Roman provinces. The disease is probably streptococcus or a form of scarlet fever with streptococcus pneumoniae (approximate date).

=== 456 ===
==== By place ====
====== Roman Empire ======
- March – Emperor Marcian sends an embassy to Carthage, to end the Vandal raids in the Mediterranean from their strongholds in North Africa, and quells disturbances on the Armenian frontier.
- Emperor Avitus sends a Germanic naval expedition under command of Ricimer, to defend Sicily. They defeat the Vandals twice: on land at the Battle of Agrigentum, and in a sea battle off Corsica.
- Summer – Capua is destroyed by the Vandals. Ricimer is unable to end piracy in the western Mediterranean. Backed by his popularity, he gains the consent of the Senate for an expedition against Avitus.
- September 17 – Remistus, Roman general (magister militum), is besieged with a Gothic force at Ravenna and later executed in the Palace in Classis, outside the city.
- October 5 – The Visigoths under King Theodoric II, acting on orders of Avitus, invade Spain with an army of Burgundians, Franks and Goths, led by their kings Chilperic I and Gondioc. They defeat the Suebi under King Rechiar on the Urbicus River, near Astorga (Gallaecia); this shatters the power of the Suebi.
- October 17 – Battle of Placentia: Ricimer, supported by Majorian (comes domesticorum), defeats the usurper Avitus near Piacenza (northern Italy). They compel him to renounce the purple, and Avitus is obliged to become bishop of Piacenza.
- October 28 – The Visigoths brutally sack the Suebi's capital of Braga (modern Portugal); churches are burnt to the ground. Rechiar flees wounded from the battlefield.
- December - Rechiar, first Germanic king to convert to Nicene Christianity, is captured at Oporto and executed.

====== Britannia ======
- Saint Patrick leaves Britain once more to evangelise Ireland as a missionary bishop.
- The Anglo-Saxons call the British nobles to a peace conference at Stonehenge, but turn on them and massacre almost everyone (approximate date).

====== Asia ======
- After a 10-year reign, Emperor Ankō is assassinated by the 10-year-old Mayowa no Ōkimi (prince Mayowa), in retaliation for the execution of his father. He is succeeded by his brother Yūryaku who becomes the 21st emperor of Japan.

=== 457 ===
==== By place ====
====== Roman Empire ======
- January 27 – Emperor Marcian dies at Constantinople, possibly of foot gangrene, an infection contracted during a long religious journey. He is buried in the Church of the Holy Apostles, together with his late wife Pulcheria.
- February 7 – Leo I, a Thraco-Roman (or Dacian) high-ranking officer, becomes the new emperor of the Eastern Roman Empire, reigning for nearly 20 years. He is first to accept the Byzantine crown from the hands of the patriarch of Constantinople.
- April 1 – Majorian is acclaimed emperor by the Roman army, after defeating 900 Alemanni near Lake Maggiore (Italy).
- December 28 – Majorian is crowned emperor of the Western Roman Empire and recognized by Pope Leo I. His rule is accepted in Italy, Dalmatia and some territories in Northern Gaul.

====== Europe ======
- According to the Anglo-Saxon Chronicle, 4,000 Britons are slain at Crecganford in battle against Hengist and his son Oisc of Kent.

====== Persia ======
- Yazdegerd II dies after a 19-year reign. He is succeeded by his son Hormizd III who seizes the Persian throne. His elder brother Peroz I rebels against him in Sistan (Iran). After months of civil war he defeats Hormizd and becomes the seventeenth Sasanian king of the Persian Empire.

==== By topic ====
====== Religion ======
- Victorius of Aquitaine computes new tables for celebrating Easter.

=== 458 ===
==== By place ====
====== Roman Empire ======
- Emperor Majorian builds a Roman fleet at Miseno and Ravenna. He strengthens the army, by recruiting a large number of barbarian mercenaries (Bastarnae, Burgundians, Huns, Ostrogoths, Rugii, Scythians and Suebi).
- Summer – The Vandals land in Campania, at the mouth of the Liri or the Garigliano River, and devastate the region. Majorian personally leads the Roman army and defeats the invaders near Sinuessa, destroying their ships on the seashore, loaded with booty.
- Battle of Arelate: Majorian defeats the Visigoths under King Theodoric II at Arles (Southern Gaul), near the Rhone River. Theodoric is forced to sign a peace treaty and becomes a foederatus (pl. foederati) of the Western Roman Empire.
- Winter – Majorian enters the Rhone Valley, and defeats the Burgundians under King Gondioc at Lugdunum. He forces the Bagaudae to join the western coalition against the Suebi in Spain.

====== Europe ======
- Childeric I succeeds his father Merovech as king of the Salian Franks. He establishes his capital at Tournai (modern Belgium) and becomes a foederatus (pl. foederati) of the Western Roman Empire.

====== Asia ======
- Jabi becomes the king of the Korean kingdom of Silla.

==== By topic ====
====== Exploration and Colonization ======
- The city of Tbilisi (Georgia) on the Kura River is founded by King Vakhtang I of Iberia. Its location gives it control of the trade routes between western and eastern Transcaucasia.

====== Religion ======
- July 3 – Gennadius I becomes patriarch of Constantinople.

=== 459 ===
==== By place ====
====== Roman Empire ======
- Emperor Leo I signs a peace treaty with the Ostrogoths. King Theodemir sends his son, the future Theodoric the Great, age 5, as a child hostage to Constantinople. He learns at court about Latin, military tactics and religion (until 469).

====== Britannia ======
- King Vortigern is burnt to death, while being besieged by a Romano-British force under Ambrosius Aurelianus at Ganarew (Herefordshire).

====== Europe ======
- The Franks conquer the city of Trier. The Frankish Kingdom becomes a military power and gets involved in Roman politics.
- Remigius, age 22, is elected bishop of Reims (approximate date).

====== Asia ======
- King Dhatusena of Anuradhapura of the Moriyan dynasty rules over Sri Lanka. During his reign the Avukana Buddha statue is built.

== Births ==
450

- February 2 – Justin I, Byzantine Emperor (d. 527)
- Ariadne, Byzantine Empress (approximate date)
- Avitus, archbishop of Vienne (approximate date) (d. 518)
- Chilperic II, king of Burgundy (approximate date)
- Gunthamund, king of the Vandals (d. 496)
- Isidore, Neoplatonist philosopher (approximate date)
- Pope Hormisdas (d. 523)
- Thrasamund, king of the Vandals (d. 523)

451

- Brigit of Kildare, Irish patron saint (approximate date)
- Jacob of Serugh, Syrian poet and theologian (approximate date)

452

- Gundobad, king of the Burgundians (approximate date)
- John the Silent, bishop and Saint (died 558)
- Qi Mingdi, emperor of Southern Qi (d. 498)
- Wang Jian, official of Liu Song and Southern Qi (d. 489)

453

- Brigit of Kildare, Irish patron saint (d. 524)
- Vedast, Frankish bishop (approximate date)

454

- Theodoric the Great, king of the Ostrogoths (d. 526)
- Xian Wen Di, Chinese emperor of Northern Wei (d. 476)

455

- Rusticus, archbishop of Lyon (approximate date)
- Wang Baoming, empress of the Southern Qi (d. 512)

456

- Liu Zixun, prince and pretender of Liu Song (d. 466)

457

- Leontia, Roman empress and wife of Anthemius (d. 479)
- Medardus, bishop of Vermandois (approximate date)

458

- Damascius, Syrian neoplatonist (approximate date)
- Xiao Zhangmao, crown prince of Southern Qi (d. 493)

459

- November 15 – Bʼutz Aj Sak Chiik, king of Palenque (Mexico).

== Deaths ==
450

- July 28 – Theodosius II, Roman Emperor (b. 401)
- July 31 – Peter Chrysologus, bishop of Ravenna
- November 27 – Galla Placidia, Roman Empress (b. 392)
- Chrysaphius, eunuch and chief minister
- Cui Hao, prime minister of Northern Wei
- Chlodio, semi legendary Frankish king and supposed great-grandfather of Clovis I (approximate date) (b.390)
- Kālidāsa, Classical Sanskrit writer (approximate date)
- Quodvultdeus, bishop of Carthage (approximate date)
- Socrates Scholasticus, church historian (approximate date)
- Sozomen, church historian (approximate date)

451

- July 29 – Tuoba Huang, prince of Northern Wei (b. 428)
- Theodoric I, king of the Visigoths
- Liu Yikang, prince of the Liu Song dynasty (b. 409)
- Pei Songzhi, Chinese historian (b. 372)
- Zeno the Prophet, Egyptian abbot and saint (approximate date)

452

- March 11 – Tai Wu Di, emperor of Northern Wei (b. 408)
- Drest I, king of the Picts (approximate date)
- Nan'an Yinwang, emperor of Northern Wei
- Yujiulü, consort and wife of Tuoba Huang
- Zong Ai, eunuch and high official

453

- c. March – Attila, ruler of the Huns (b. 406)
- March 16 – Emperor Wen of Song, assassinated (b. 407)
- May 27 – executed:
  - Liu Jun, Prince Shixing of the Liu Song dynasty (b. 429)
  - Liu Shao, emperor of Liu Song (b. 426)
  - Pan, concubine of Wen Di
  - Empress Yin of Liu Song, forced suicide
- July – Pulcheria, Byzantine Empress
- Helian, empress of Northern Wei
- Thorismund, king of the Visigoths, assassinated
- Approximate traditional date:
  - Emperor Ingyō of Japan
  - Prince Kinashi no Karu of Japan

454

- September 21 – Flavius Aetius, Roman general (magister militum)
- Ellac, king of the Huns
- Justa Grata Honoria, sister of Valentinian III (approximate date)
- Dioscorus the Great, patriarch of Alexandria

455

- March 16
  - Valentinian III, emperor of the Western Roman Empire (b. 419)
  - Heraclius, Roman courtier (primicerius sacri cubiculi )
- May 31 – Petronius Maximus, emperor of the Western Roman Empire
- Biyu of Baekje, king of Baekje
- Catigern, prince and son of Vortigern (approximate date)
- Horsa, leader of the Anglo-Saxons (approximate date)
- Kumaragupta I, ruler of the Gupta Empire (India)
- Niall Noigiallach, High King of Ireland (approximate date)
- Palladius, son of Petronius Maximus (approximate date)
- Prosper of Aquitaine, disciple and Christian writer (approximate date)

456

- September 17 – Remistus, Roman general (magister militum)
- Emperor Ankō of Japan (approximate date)
- Eutyches, presbyter and archimandrite (approximate date)
- Rechiar, king of the Suebi (captured and executed)
- Talorc I, king of the Picts (approximate date)

457

- January 27 – Flavius Marcian, Roman emperor (b. 392)
- October 28 – Ibas, bishop of Edessa (modern Turkey)
- Avitus, emperor of the Western Roman Empire
- Merovech, king of the Salian Franks (approximate date)
- Palladius, first bishop of Ireland (approximate date)
- Saint Proterius, Patriarch of Alexandria
- Theodoret of Cyrrhus, bishop and theologian
- Valerian of Abbenza, bishop and saint (b. 377)
- Yazdegerd II, king of the Persian Empire

458

- July 3 – Anatolius, patriarch of Constantinople
- Nulji, king of Silla (Korea)

459

- September 2 – Simeon Stylites, Christian pillar-saint.
- Hormizd III, king of the Sasanian Empire (approximate date)
- Vortigern, king of the Britons (approximate date)
