= Otohime (disambiguation) =

Otohime (乙姫) is the princess of the Dragon Palace in the Japanese folktale Urashima Tarō.

Otohime may also refer to:

== People ==
- Otohime Ryugu, a character in Okami-san and Her Seven Companions
- Otohime, a goddess the anime series Lilpri
- Otohime, a character in the 2009 anime series Muromi-san
- Mutsumi Otohime, a character from the manga series Love Hina by Ken Akamatsu
- Sanman, the second daughter of Minamoto no Yoritomo, nicknamed Otohime (乙姫).
- Otohime (弟姫), concubine or daughter of Emperor Ingyō.
- Queen Otohime, the former queen of the fishmen from One Piece
- Otohime, a character from Shadowverse

== Science and technology ==
- Otohime, a subgenus of Pterygotrigla fishes
- Centrodraco otohime, a slope dragonet fish

== Other ==
- Otohime (音姫, lit. "Sound Princess"), a Japanese brand name for a flushing toilet sound simulator
