= Princess Sotoorihime =

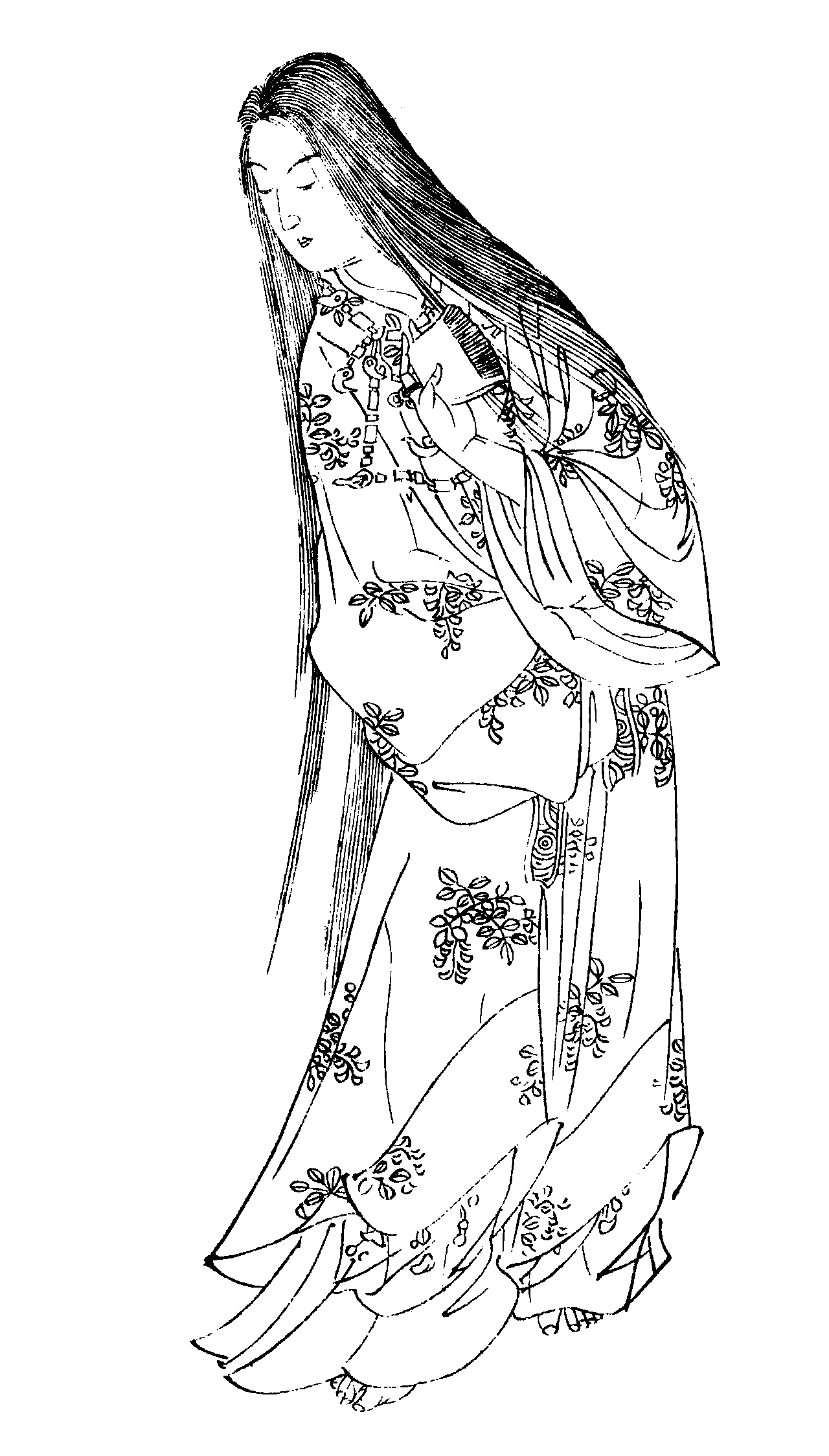
Princess Sotoorihime as depicted by Kikuchi Yōsai in Zenken Kojitsu.

Princess Sotoorihime (衣通姫) aka "Sotooshihime" (そとおりひめ or そとほりひめ) is a woman described as "exquisitely beautiful" in the Kojiki. While her true identity is unknown, she is said to have been either a concubine or daughter of Emperor Ingyō. Sotoorihime is also regarded as one of the "Waka Sanjin" (the Three gods of waka poem). She is jointly enshrined with Wakahiru-me and Empress Jingū at Tamatsushima-jinja Shrine.

== Concubine ==
One of Princess Sotoorihime's possible identities is said to be that of Emperor Ingyō's concubine "Otohime" ("youngest princess"). At the time Otohime was also given the designation of "Sotohoshi-no-iratsume", meaning her "beauty" shone through her clothes. According to the Nihon Shoki, Ingyō's wife unintentionally introduced her husband to her younger sister at a banquet sometime in the winter of 418 AD. When the Emperor summoned her, she initially refused to comply as she was mindful of her older sister's feelings. She eventually relented but was kept in a separate residence due to the jealousy of Ingyō's wife. Two songs sung by Otohime (aka Sotohori) during her lifetime are recorded by the Nihon Shoki which describe her feelings towards Ingyō:

This is the night
My husband will come.
the little crab-
The spider's action
To-night is manifest

— Sotohori Iratsume (419 AD), Nihon Shoki

For ever and ever
oh! that I might meet my Lord!
As often as drift beachward
The weeds of the shore of ocean
(Where whales are caught)

— Sotohori Iratsume (422 AD), Nihon Shoki

The first song was sung by Otohime when she was sitting alone and fondly thinking of Ingyō. She was unaware that the Emperor heard her singing and was touched by her words, so she was startled and surprised by his presence when he replied with a song of his own. When translating the Nihon Shoki, Sholar William George Aston mentions it was considered at the time a sign that "an intimate friend would arrive" if a spider clung to one's garments. He also commented on how the word "little crab" is also another name for a spider. The second song was sung by Otohime when the Emperor was making his way to her separate residence. Ingyō warns Otohime afterwards that nobody else must hear this song especially the Empress. Thus "men at the time" gave a name for the shore-weed by calling it "Na-nori-ahi-mo". Aston notes that the reasoning behind this name is unclear as "Na-nori ahi" translates to "mutually to tell one's name" and "mo" is the general word for seaweed.

== Daughter ==
Another possible identity of "Princess Sotoorihime" could have been Emperor Ingyō's daughter Karu no Ōiratsume (軽大娘皇女). In this version of events, the Kojiki diverges from the Nihon Shoki by saying that Sotohoshi-no-iratsume (aka Otohime) is another name for Karu. According to the Kojiki, Emperor Ingyō's first son Kinashi had an incestuous relationship with his sister Ōiratsume. Due to the taboo involved, Kinashi was betrayed by his retainers and shunned upon by society. As Imperial ministers favored his younger brother Anaho (穴穂皇子), Kinashi chose to engage him in battle. The 'war" ended with Kinashi's defeat and he was exiled to Iyo by Anaho, who later became Emperor Ankō. Ōiratsume followed her lover Kinashi to Iyo afterwards and the two committed suicide together.

The Nihon Shoki on the other hand states that Karu no Ōiratsume was the one who was banished by her father Emperor Ingyō. Sholar William George Aston expresses doubt in his translated notes that a princess would be banished. His reasoning is; "Historically women have always been more lightly punished than men for the same offense, and the particular character of the fault in this case makes such a discrimination all the more reasonable".
