= 450 =

450 in various calendars
Gregorian calendar	450; CDL
Ab urbe condita	1203
Assyrian calendar	5200
Balinese saka calendar	371–372
Bengali calendar	−144 – −143
Berber calendar	1400
Buddhist calendar	994
Burmese calendar	−188
Byzantine calendar	5958–5959
Chinese calendar	己丑年 (Earth Ox); 3147 or 2940 — to — 庚寅年 (Metal Tiger); 3148 or 2941
Coptic calendar	166–167
Discordian calendar	1616
Ethiopian calendar	442–443
Hebrew calendar	4210–4211
- Hindu calendars
Vikram Samvat	506–507
Shaka Samvat	371–372
Kali Yuga	3550–3551
Holocene calendar	10450
Iranian calendar	172 BP – 171 BP
Islamic calendar	177 BH – 176 BH
Javanese calendar	335–336
Julian calendar	450; CDL
Korean calendar	2783
Minguo calendar	1462 before ROC 民前1462年
Nanakshahi calendar	−1018
Seleucid era	761/762 AG
Thai solar calendar	992–993
Tibetan calendar	ས་མོ་གླང་ལོ་ (female Earth-Ox); 576 or 195 or −577 — to — ལྕགས་ཕོ་སྟག་ལོ་ (male Iron-Tiger); 577 or 196 or −576

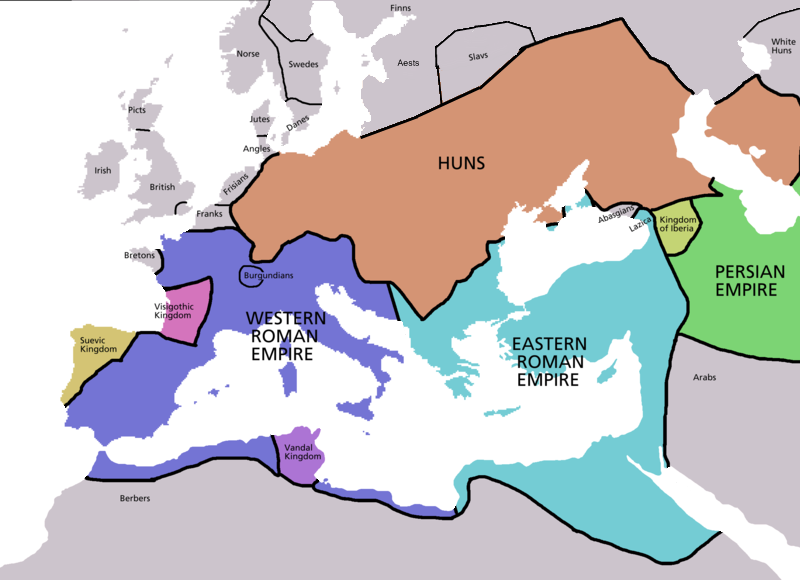
Europe in 450

Year 450 (CDL, CCCCL) was a common year starting on Sunday of the Julian calendar, the 450th Year of the Common Era (CE) and Anno Domini (AD designations, the 450th year of the 1st millennium, the 50th year of the half of 5th century, and the 1st year of the 450s decade. At the time, it was known as the Year of the Consulship of Valentinianus and Avienus (or, less frequently, year 1203 Ab urbe condita). The denomination 450 for this year has been used since the early medieval period, when the Anno Domini calendar era became the prevalent method in Europe for naming years.

== Events ==
=== By place ===
==== Byzantium ====
- July 28 – Emperor Theodosius II, age 49, falls from his horse while hunting at Constantinople and dies soon afterward. He has reigned since 408, mostly under the domination of his Christian sister Pulcheria, who has been allowed to return to court (see 441).
- August 25 – Pulcheria is forced to marry and co-rule the Eastern Roman Empire. She gives the imperial diadem to the Illyrian (or Thracian) officer and senator Marcian, age 58, and is crowned as empress in the Hippodrome at Constantinople, in the first religious coronation ceremony.
- Marcian orders the execution (or assassination) of the unpopular court eunuch Chrysaphius. He discontinues the tribute payments to Attila.
- All the Temples of Aphrodisias (City of Goddess Aphrodite) are demolished and its libraries burned down. The city is renamed Stauroupolis (City of the Cross).

==== Europe ====
- Spring – Justa Grata Honoria, eldest sister of emperor Valentinian III, sends her ring to Attila the Hun in an effort to escape a marriage being forced upon her by her brother. Now about 34, she has had an affair with an officer in her household and has allegedly plotted to overthrow Valentinian, who has sent her to a convent at Constantinople. Attila announces his intention to marry her, says he expects to be given half the Western Roman Empire as her dowry, and gathers a large Hun invasion force. Flavius Aetius, Roman general (magister militum), musters an army in Gaul of Burgundians, Celts, Ripuarians, Salian Franks and Visigoths under the command of the Visigoth king Theodoric I.
- Remodelling of the Dome of Baptistry of Neon, Ravenna (Italy) begins (approximate date).

==== Persia ====
- King Yazdegerd II summons the leading Armenian nobles to the Persian capital Ctesiphon, pressuring them to cut their ties with the Western Church.

==== Asia ====
- Nalanda University (India) is founded (approximate date).

=== By topic ===
==== Agriculture ====
- Metal horseshoes come into more common use in the Near East and in Europe, increasing the efficiency of horsepower in agriculture and transportation.

== Births ==
- February 2 – Justin I, Byzantine Emperor (d. 527)
- Ariadne, Byzantine Empress (approximate date)
- Avitus, archbishop of Vienne (approximate date) (d. 518)
- Chilperic II, king of Burgundy (approximate date)
- Gunthamund, king of the Vandals (d. 496)
- Isidore, Neoplatonist philosopher (approximate date)
- Pope Hormisdas (d. 523)
- Thrasamund, king of the Vandals (d. 523)

== Deaths ==
- July 28 – Theodosius II, Roman Emperor (b. 401)
- July 31 – Peter Chrysologus, bishop of Ravenna
- November 27 – Galla Placidia, Roman Empress (b. 392)
- Chrysaphius, eunuch and chief minister
- Cui Hao, prime minister of Northern Wei
- Chlodio, semi legendary Frankish king and supposed great-grandfather of Clovis I (approximate date) (b.390)
- Kālidāsa, Classical Sanskrit writer (approximate date)
- Quodvultdeus, bishop of Carthage (approximate date)
- Socrates Scholasticus, church historian (approximate date)
- Sozomen, church historian (approximate date)
