= Princess Kusakanohatabino =

Kusakanohatabino

Empress consort of Japan
- Tenure: 400–405
- Died: after 405
- Spouse: Emperor Richū
- Issue: Princess Nakashi
- House: Imperial House of Japan
- Father: Emperor Ōjin

Princess Kusakanohatabino (also Kusaka no hatabi no) (? – after 405) was Empress of Japan as the consort of her nephew, Emperor Richū.

She was the daughter of Emperor Ōjin. She gave birth to Princess Nakashi.

== Issue ==
- Princess Nakashi (中磯皇女), wife of Prince Ōkusaka, later married Emperor Anko

== Notes ==
Japanese royalty
Preceded by Princess Yata	Empress consort of Japan appointed 405	Succeeded by Oshisaka no Ōnakatsuhime
