= Princess Yata =

Yata

Empress consort of Japan
- Tenure: 350–399
- Died: after 399
- Spouse: Emperor Nintoku
- House: Imperial House of Japan
- Father: Emperor Ōjin

Princess Yata (八田皇女) was Empress of Japan as the consort of her half-brother Emperor Nintoku.

Yata was a daughter of Emperor Ōjin. Early in Emperor Nintokus' reign, he wished to take Princess Yata as a concubine; his empress, Princess Iwa, forbade it. In 347, Emperor Nintoku's first wife, Princess Iwa died. Upon her death, Princess Yata was wed to Emperor Nintoku.

== Notes ==
Japanese royalty
Preceded by Princess Iwa	Empress consort of Japan appointed 350	Succeeded by Princess Kusakanohatabino
