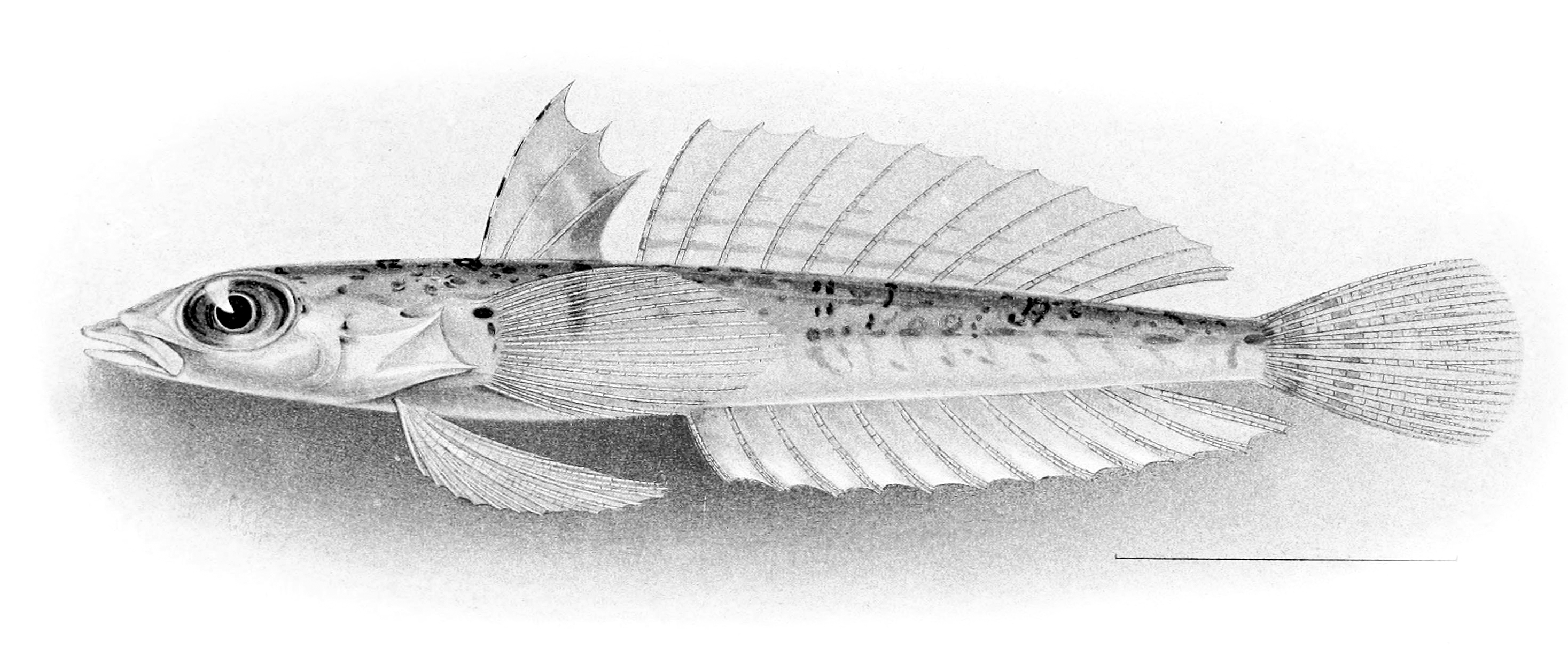

Scientific classification
- Kingdom: Animalia
- Phylum: Chordata
- Class: Actinopterygii
- Order: Syngnathiformes
- Family: Draconettidae
- Genus: Draconetta; D. S. Jordan & Fowler, 1903
- Species: D. xenica

Binomial name
- Draconetta xenica Jordan & Fowler, 1903

= Common slope dragonet =

Species of fish

The common slope dragonet (Draconetta xenica) is a species of slope dragonet native to the Indo-Pacific region where it can be found from Africa to the Hawaiian Islands. It is a benthic fish, occurring on sandy bottoms at the edges of the continental shelves at depths of from 138 to 367 metres (453 to 1,204 ft). This species grows to a length of 9 centimetres (3.5 in) SL. This species is the only known member of its genus.
