= Centrodraco ornatus =

Scientific classification
- Kingdom: Animalia
- Phylum: Chordata
- Class: Actinopterygii
- Order: Syngnathiformes
- Family: Draconettidae
- Genus: Centrodraco
- Species: C. otohime

Binomial name
- Centrodraco otohime Nakabo & Yamamoto, 1980

Species of fish

Centrodraco otohime is a species of fish in the family Draconettidae, the slope dragonets. It is found in the north-western Pacific Ocean.

== Description ==
This species reaches a length of 11.0 cm (4.3 in).

== Etymology ==
The fish is named for Otohime, the Princess of the Dragon Palace, Ryūgū-jō, which is at the bottom of the sea, in the Japanese fairy tale Urashima Tarō.
