= Oshisaka no Ōnakatsuhime =

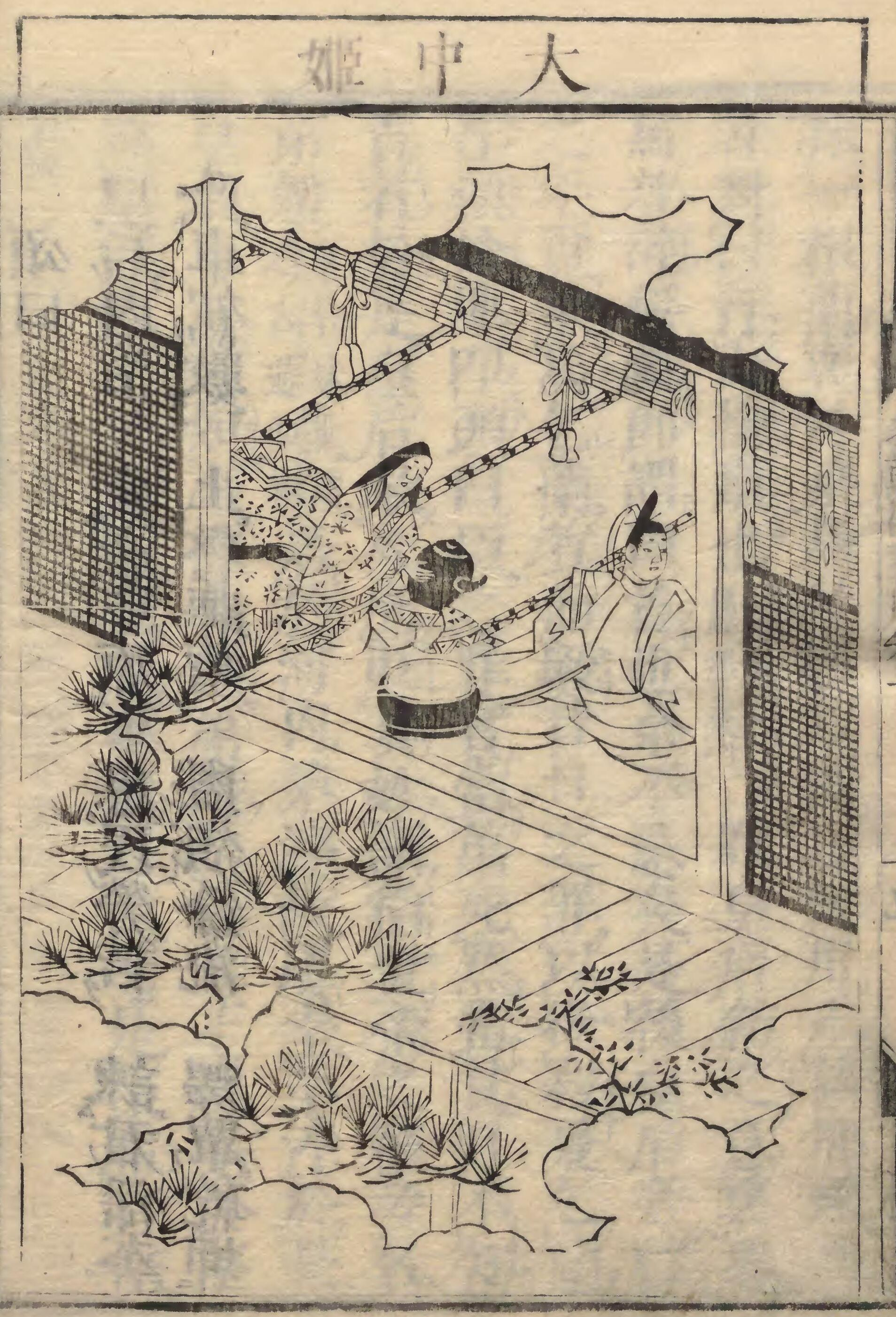

Empress consort of Japan
- Tenure: 413–453

Empress dowager of Japan
- Tenure: appointed in 453
- Died: after 453
- Spouse: Emperor Ingyō
- Issue: Prince Kinashi no Karu; Princess Nagata no Ōiratsume; Prince Sakai no Kurohiko; Emperor Ankō; Princess Karu no Ōiratsume; Prince Yatsuri no Shirahiko; Emperor Yūryaku; Princess Tajima no Tachibana no Ōiratsume; Princess Sakami
- House: Imperial House of Japan
- Father: Prince Wakanuke no Futamata

Oshisaka no Ōnakatsuhime (? – after 453) was Empress of Japan as the consort of Emperor Ingyō. In the Nihon Shoki, she has a younger sister named Otohime who becomes estranged with her husband.

Daughter of Prince Wakanuke no Futamata; granddaughter of Emperor Ōjin. Gave birth to Emperor Ankō, Emperor Yūryaku and seven other children. Empress Dowager from 453.

- First Son: Prince Kinashi no Karu (木梨軽皇子)
- First Daughter: Princess Nagata no Ōiratsume (名形大娘皇女)
- Second Son: Prince Sakai no Kurohiko (境黒彦皇子; d.456)
- Third Son: Prince Anaho (穴穂皇子), later Emperor Ankō (401?–456)
- Second Daughter: Princess Karu no Ōiratsume (軽大娘皇女)
- Fourth Son: Prince Yatsuri no Shirahiko (八釣白彦皇子; 401-456)
- Fifth Son: Prince Ōhatuse no Wakatakeru (大泊瀬稚武皇子), later Emperor Yūryaku
- Third Daughter: Princess Tajima no Tachibana no Ōiratsume (但馬橘大娘皇女)
- Fourth Daughter: Princess Sakami (酒見皇女)

== Notes ==
Japanese royalty
Preceded by Princess Kusakanohatabino	Empress consort of Japan; 413–453	Succeeded by Princess Nakashi
Preceded by Nakatsuhime	Empress dowager of Japan appointed in 453	Succeeded by Princess Tachibana no Nakatsu
