= Princess Nakashi =

Nakashi

Empress consort of Japan
- Tenure: 455–456
- Died: after 455
- Spouse: Emperor Ankō
- House: Imperial House of Japan
- Father: Emperor Richū
- Mother: Princess Kusakanohatabino

Princess Nakashi (? – after 455) was Empress of Japan as the consort of Emperor Ankō. Nakashi was previously married to Prince Ōkusaka, son of Emperor Nintoku. According to the Nihongi, Emperor Ankō had Okusaka executed (believing false accusations of disobedience), and, possibly in regret for unjustly executing Okusaka, took Nakashi as his own. She became a concubine of Emperor Ankō in 454 and was appointed empress 455. Emperor Anko came to love her greatly.

Nakashi already had a child with her first husband, Okusaka. This child, Prince Mayuwa, was thereafter raised in the imperial palace.

She was the daughter of Emperor Richū and Princess Kusakanohatabino.

== Notes ==
Japanese royalty
Preceded by Oshisaka no Ōnakatsuhime	Empress consort of Japan; 455–456	Succeeded by Kusaka no Hatabi no hime
