= Centrodraco =

Scientific classification
- Kingdom: Animalia
- Phylum: Chordata
- Class: Actinopterygii
- Order: Syngnathiformes
- Family: Draconettidae
- Genus: Centrodraco; Regan, 1913

Type species
- Draconetta acanthopoma Regan, 1904

Genus of fishes

Centrodraco is a genus of slope dragonets found in deep waters of the Atlantic, Indian & Pacific Oceans.

== Species ==
There are currently 13 recognized species in this genus:

- Centrodraco abstractum R. Fricke, 2002 (Abstract slope dragonet)
- Centrodraco acanthopoma (Regan, 1904) (North Atlantic slope dragonet)
- Centrodraco atrifilum R. Fricke, 2010
- Centrodraco fidelis R. Fricke, 2015
- Centrodraco gegonipus (Parin, 1982) (Sala y Gómez slope dragonet)
- Centrodraco insolitus (McKay, 1971) (Western Australian slope dragonet)
- Centrodraco lineatus R. Fricke, 1992
- Centrodraco nakaboi R. Fricke, 1992 (Nakabo's slope dragonet)
- Centrodraco oregonus (Briggs & F. H. Berry, 1959) (Brazilian slope dragonet)
- Centrodraco ornatus (Fourmanoir & Rivaton, 1979) (Ornate slope dragonet)
- Centrodraco pseudoxenicus (Kamohara, 1952) (Japanese slope dragonet)
- Centrodraco rubellus R. Fricke, Chave & Suzumoto, 1992
- Centrodraco striatus (Parin, 1982) (Striped slope dragonet)

Synonyms

- Centrodraco otohime Nakabo & Yamamoto, 1980, synonym of Centrodraco ornatus
