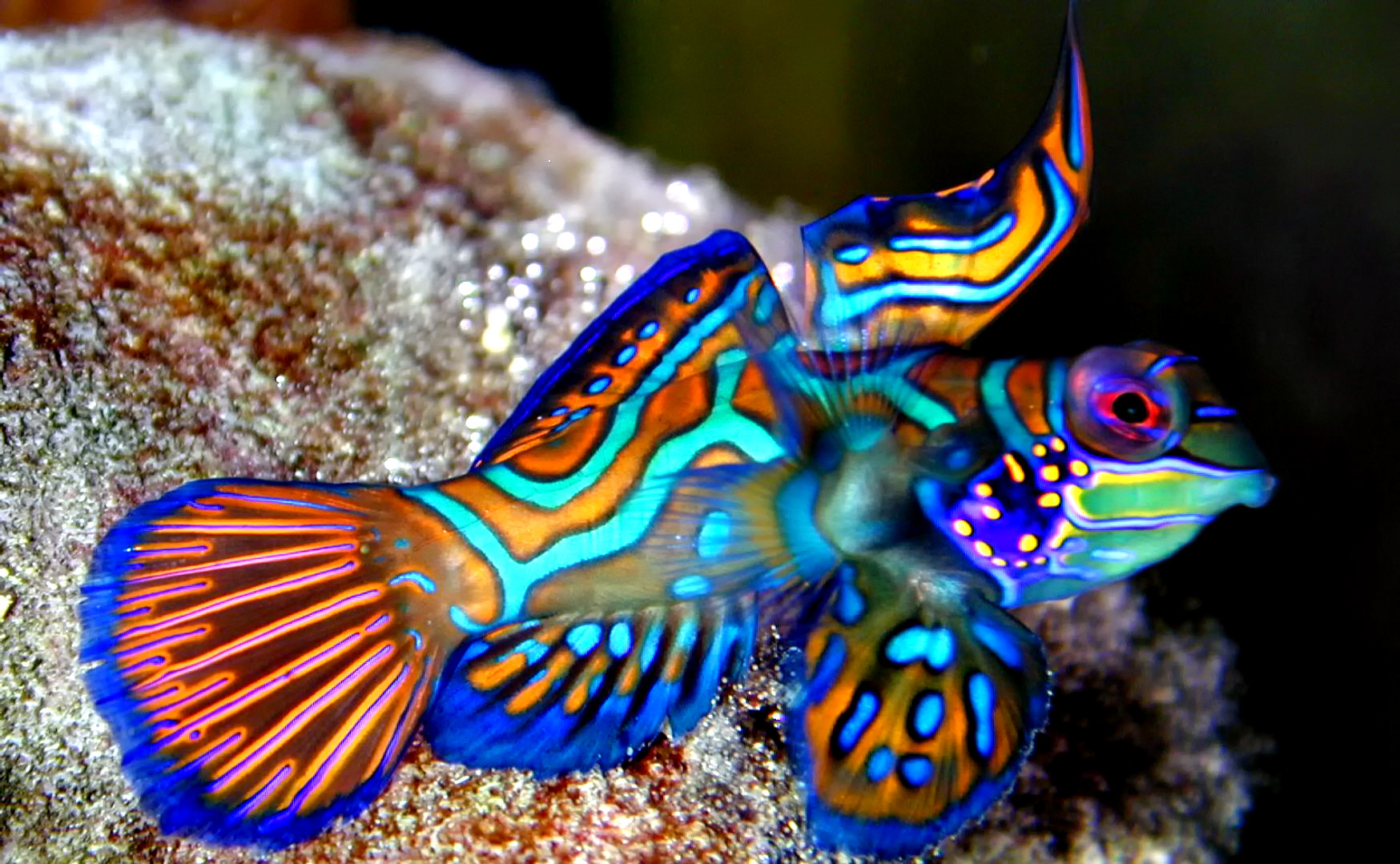
- Mandarinfish, (Synchiropus splendidus)

Scientific classification
- Kingdom: Animalia
- Phylum: Chordata
- Class: Actinopterygii
- Order: Syngnathiformes
- Suborder: Callionymoidei

Type species
- Callionymus lyra Linnaeus, 1758

= Callionymoidei =

Callionymoidei Temporal range: Early Eocene to present

Order of fishes

Callionymoidei /kæliˈɒnɪmɪfɔːrmiːz/ is a suborder of syngnathiform fish containing two families, the dragonets Callionymidae and the Draconettidae. In the past, this group was treated as either the suborder Callionymoidei of the wider Perciformes (now known to be a paraphyletic treatment), or as a distinct order Callionymiformes. Nelson (2016) recognised it as a distinct oder but subsequent workers have suggested that if Callionymiformes is recognised as an order then the order Syngnathiformes is rendered paraphyletic and include Callionmyoidei within that taxon. It is presently considered a suborder of Syngnathiformes.

The earliest known fossil callionymoid is the stem-callionymid †Gilmourella Carnevale & Bannikov, 2019 from the Early Eocene-aged Monte Bolca site of Italy.

== Families ==
The two families placed under Callionymoidei by Eschmeyer's Catalog of Fishes are:

- Callionymidae Bonaparte, 1831 (dragonets)
- Draconettidae Jordan & Fowler, 1903 (slope dragonets)
