= 527 =

Calendar year

527 in various calendars
Gregorian calendar	527; DXXVII
Ab urbe condita	1280
Assyrian calendar	5277
Balinese saka calendar	448–449
Bengali calendar	−67 – −66
Berber calendar	1477
Buddhist calendar	1071
Burmese calendar	−111
Byzantine calendar	6035–6036
Chinese calendar	丙午年 (Fire Horse); 3224 or 3017 — to — 丁未年 (Fire Goat); 3225 or 3018
Coptic calendar	243–244
Discordian calendar	1693
Ethiopian calendar	519–520
Hebrew calendar	4287–4288
- Hindu calendars
Vikram Samvat	583–584
Shaka Samvat	448–449
Kali Yuga	3627–3628
Holocene calendar	10527
Iranian calendar	95 BP – 94 BP
Islamic calendar	98 BH – 97 BH
Javanese calendar	414–415
Julian calendar	527; DXXVII
Korean calendar	2860
Minguo calendar	1385 before ROC 民前1385年
Nanakshahi calendar	−941
Seleucid era	838/839 AG
Thai solar calendar	1069–1070
Tibetan calendar	མེ་ཕོ་རྟ་ལོ་ (male Fire-Horse); 653 or 272 or −500 — to — མེ་མོ་ལུག་ལོ་ (female Fire-Sheep); 654 or 273 or −499

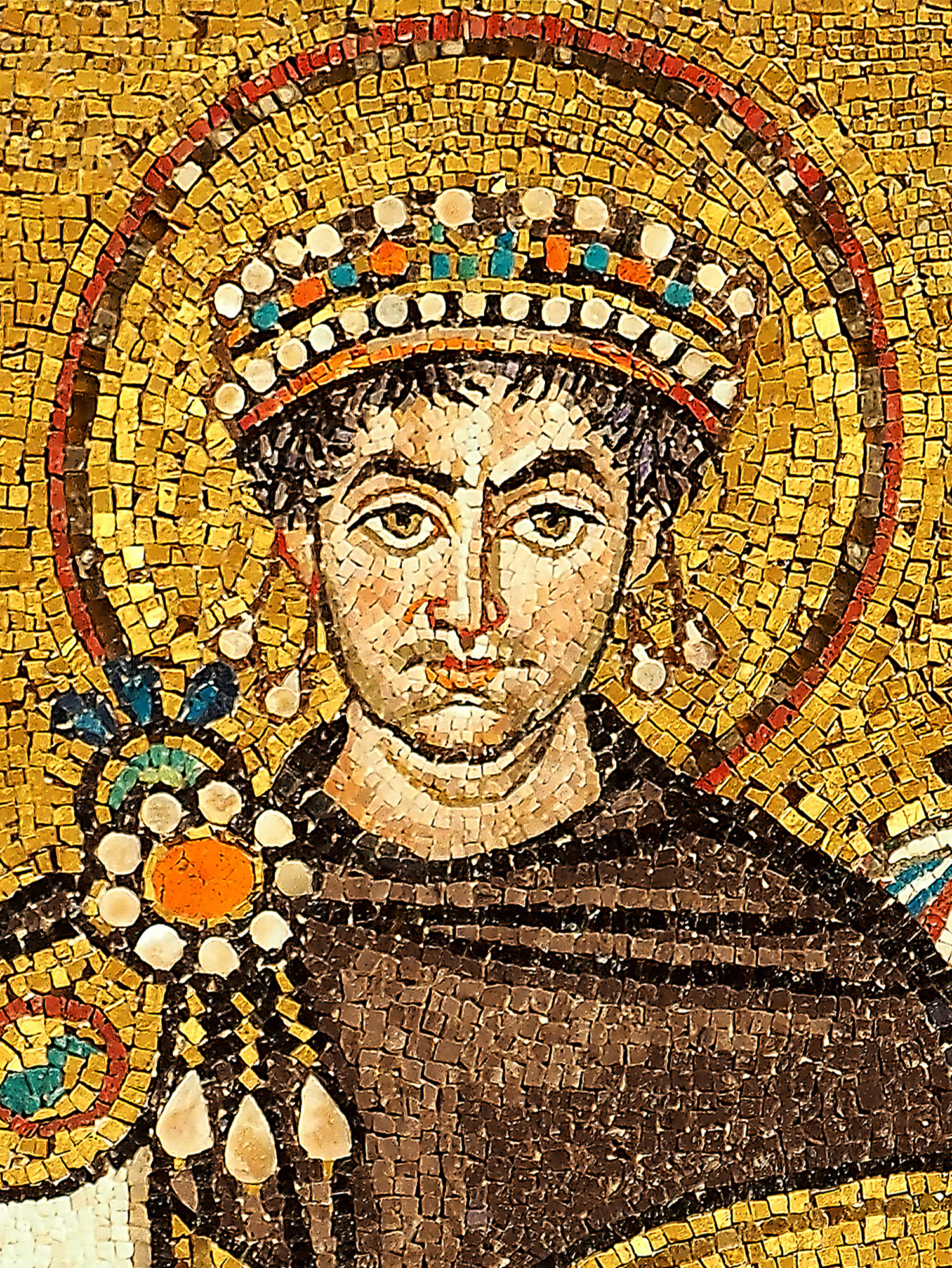
Emperor Justinian I (527–565)

Year 527 (DXXVII) was a common year starting on Friday of the Julian calendar. At the time, it was known as the Year of the Consulship of Mavortius without Colleague (or, less frequently, year 1280 Ab urbe condita). The denomination 527 for this year has been used since the early medieval period, when the Anno Domini calendar era became the prevalent method in Europe for naming years.

== Events ==
=== By place ===
==== Byzantine Empire ====
- April 1 – Emperor Justin I names his nephew Justinian I as co-ruler, as an incurable wound saps his strength.
- August 1 – Justin I, age 77, dies at Constantinople and is succeeded by Justinian I, who becomes sole emperor.
- Justinian I reorganises the command structure of the Byzantine army, and fields a small but highly trained army.
- Justinian I appoints Belisarius to command the Eastern army in Armenia and on the Byzantine-Persian frontier.

==== Britannia ====
- King Cerdic of Wessex and his son Cynric defeat the Britons at Cerdicesleah (modern Chearsley).
- The Kingdom of Essex is founded by the Saxons, who land north of the Thames. They take control of the land between what is now London and St Albans, ceding from the Kingdom of Kent
- Æscwine becomes the first king of Essex (approximate date), defeating Octa in battle at Hackney, west of the River Lea.

==== Japan ====
- Iwai Rebellion: A revolt against the Yamato court breaks out in Tsukushi Province (according to Nihon Shoki).

=== By topic ===
==== Religion ====
- Justinian I outlaws pagan religious practices in Egypt, and dispatches Byzantine missionaries to southern territories (approximate date).
- The Church of the Nativity in Bethlehem is rebuilt until 565, restoring the architectural tone of the basilica.
- Silla, one of the Three Kingdoms of Korea, formally adopts Buddhism as a state religion (approximate date).

== Deaths ==
- August 1 – Justin I, Byzantine Emperor (b. 450)
- Illan mac Dúnlainge, king of Leinster (Ireland)
