= 523 =

Calendar year

523 in various calendars
Gregorian calendar	523; DXXIII
Ab urbe condita	1276
Assyrian calendar	5273
Balinese saka calendar	444–445
Bengali calendar	−71 – −70
Berber calendar	1473
Buddhist calendar	1067
Burmese calendar	−115
Byzantine calendar	6031–6032
Chinese calendar	壬寅年 (Water Tiger); 3220 or 3013 — to — 癸卯年 (Water Rabbit); 3221 or 3014
Coptic calendar	239–240
Discordian calendar	1689
Ethiopian calendar	515–516
Hebrew calendar	4283–4284
- Hindu calendars
Vikram Samvat	579–580
Shaka Samvat	444–445
Kali Yuga	3623–3624
Holocene calendar	10523
Iranian calendar	99 BP – 98 BP
Islamic calendar	102 BH – 101 BH
Javanese calendar	410–411
Julian calendar	523; DXXIII
Korean calendar	2856
Minguo calendar	1389 before ROC 民前1389年
Nanakshahi calendar	−945
Seleucid era	834/835 AG
Thai solar calendar	1065–1066
Tibetan calendar	ཆུ་ཕོ་སྟག་ལོ་ (male Water-Tiger); 649 or 268 or −504 — to — ཆུ་མོ་ཡོས་ལོ་ (female Water-Hare); 650 or 269 or −503

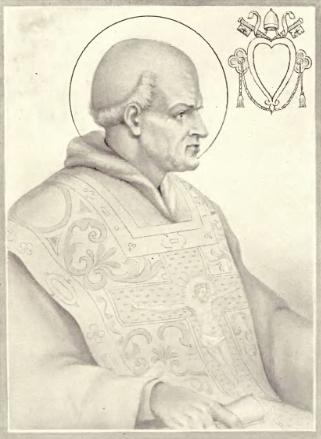
Pope John I (523–526)

Year 523 (DXXIII) was a common year starting on Sunday of the Julian calendar. At the time, it was known as the Year of the Consulship of Maximus without colleague (or, less frequently, year 1276 Ab urbe condita). The denomination 523 for this year has been used since the early medieval period, when the Anno Domini calendar era became the prevalent method in Europe for naming years.

== Events ==
=== By place ===
==== Byzantine Empire ====
- Justinian, later Byzantine emperor, marries in Constantinople his mistress Theodora, who is by profession a courtesan (approximate date).

==== Europe ====
- King Chlothar I takes part in an expedition against Burgundy and captures the town of Autun. Now about 26, he makes plans to expand the territory he inherited from his late father, Clovis I.
- King Sigismund of Burgundy is defeated by the invading Franks under Chlodomer, Childebert I and Chlothar I. He is captured and taken as prisoner to Aurelianum (modern Orléans).

==== Africa ====
- Hilderic succeeds his uncle Thrasamund after a 27-year reign, and becomes king of the Vandals and Alans. He favours Catholicism and grants the inhabitants religious freedom.
- Leptis Magna (modern Libya) is sacked by Berber (Moor) raiders. Gelimer leads a successful expedition in North Africa.

==== Asia ====
- A revolt breaks out on the Six Garrisons, on the northern border of Northern Wei China ("Revolt of the Six Garrisons"). Tensions between the elite and the Tuoba-clan severely destabilise the state.
- The Songyue Pagoda is completed during the Northern Wei era; the circular-based tower is still 40 m (131 ft) in height.
- Seong becomes king of Baekje, one of the Three Kingdoms of Korea.

=== By topic ===
==== Religion ====
- August 6 – Pope Hormisdas dies at Rome after a tenure of 9 years and 17 days, in which he has been instrumental in ending the Acacian Schism. He is succeeded by John I as the 53rd pope.

== Births ==
- Aurelianus, archbishop of Arles (d. 551)

== Deaths ==
- August 6 – Pope Hormisdas (b. 450)
- Arethas, leader of the Christian community in Yemen
- Muryeong, king of Baekje (Three Kingdoms of Korea)
- Philoxenus of Mabbug, Syrian theologian
- Thrasamund, king of the Vandals (b. 450)
