= 392 =

392 in various calendars
- Gregorian calendar: 392; CCCXCII
- Ab urbe condita: 1145
- Assyrian calendar: 5142
- Balinese saka calendar: 313–314
- Bengali calendar: −202 – −201
- Berber calendar: 1342
- Buddhist calendar: 936
- Burmese calendar: −246
- Byzantine calendar: 5900–5901
- Chinese calendar: 辛卯年 (Metal Rabbit); 3089 or 2882 — to — 壬辰年 (Water Dragon); 3090 or 2883
- Coptic calendar: 108–109
- Discordian calendar: 1558
- Ethiopian calendar: 384–385
- Hebrew calendar: 4152–4153
- Hindu calendars
- Vikram Samvat: 448–449
- Shaka Samvat: 313–314
- Kali Yuga: 3492–3493
- Holocene calendar: 10392
- Iranian calendar: 230 BP – 229 BP
- Islamic calendar: 237 BH – 236 BH
- Javanese calendar: 275–276
- Julian calendar: 392; CCCXCII
- Korean calendar: 2725
- Minguo calendar: 1520 before ROC 民前1520年
- Nanakshahi calendar: −1076
- Seleucid era: 703/704 AG
- Thai solar calendar: 934–935
- Tibetan calendar: ལྕགས་མོ་ཡོས་ལོ་ (female Iron-Hare); 518 or 137 or −635 — to — ཆུ་ཕོ་འབྲུག་ལོ་ (male Water-Dragon); 519 or 138 or −634

Year 392 (CCCXCII) was a leap year starting on Thursday of the Julian calendar. At the time, it was known as the Year of the Consulship of Augustus and Rufinus (or, less frequently, year 1145 Ab urbe condita). The denomination 392 for this year has been used since the early medieval period, when the Anno Domini calendar era became the prevalent method in Europe for naming years.

== Events ==
=== By place ===
==== Roman Empire ====
- Stilicho, Roman general (magister militum), defeats the Visigoths and Huns in Thrace. Emperor Theodosius I permits Alaric to go free on condition he provides, as foederati, military services to the Roman Empire.
- May 15 – Emperor Valentinian II, age 21, dies while advancing into Gaul against the Frankish usurper Arbogast. He is found hanging in his residence at Vienne under unknown circumstances.
- August 22 – Arbogast nominates Eugenius, Roman teacher of rhetoric, as the next emperor of the Western Roman Empire. He sends ambassadors to Theodosius's court asking for his recognition.
- November 8 – Theodosius I issues an edict reinforcing the prohibition of prayers or sacrifices at non-Christian temples, leading to the persecution of pagans and the end of the almost 2,000-year-old Eleusinian Mysteries. He also bans items of pagan spiritual significance that could be used in the home, such as incense or spiritual figures.

==== Asia ====
- Asin becomes king of the Korean kingdom of Baekje.

== Births ==
- Flavius Marcian, Roman Emperor (d. 457)
- Galla Placidia, Roman Empress and daughter of Theodosius I (d. 450)
- Ming Yuan Di, emperor of the Xianbei state Northern Wei (d. 423)

== Deaths ==
- May 15 – Valentinian II, Roman Emperor (b. 371)
- Gregory Bæticus, bishop of Elvira (Spain)
