= Prince Kinashi no Karu =

Kinashi no Karu
- Crown Prince of Japan
- Spouse: Karu no Ōiratsume
- Father: Emperor Ingyō
- Mother: Oshisaka no Ōnakatsuhime

Prince Kinashi no Karu (木梨軽皇子, Kinashi no Karu no Miko) was a Japanese prince. He was a son of Emperor Ingyō.

Prince Kinashi no Karu, Princess Karu no Ōiratsume, Prince Anaho (Emperor Ankō) and Prince Ōhatsuse Wakatake (Emperor Yūryaku) were born as children of Ingyō and Oshisaka no Ōnakatsuhime. Prince Kinashi no Karu was the first son of his father.

Prince Kinashi no Karu was elected as the crown prince, but was accused of an incestuous relationship with his sister, Princess Karu no Ōiratsume.

After his father's death, Anaho battled with Kinashi no Karu. Anaho defeated Kinashi no Karu, becoming Emperor Ankō. According to Kojiki, Kinashi no Karu was sent into exile to Iyo Province and then committed suicide.

According to Nihon Shoki, Karu no Ōiratsume was sent into exile to Iyo Province during the reign of her father because of their incestuous relationship and Prince Kinashi no Karu committed suicide during the battle with Anaho.
