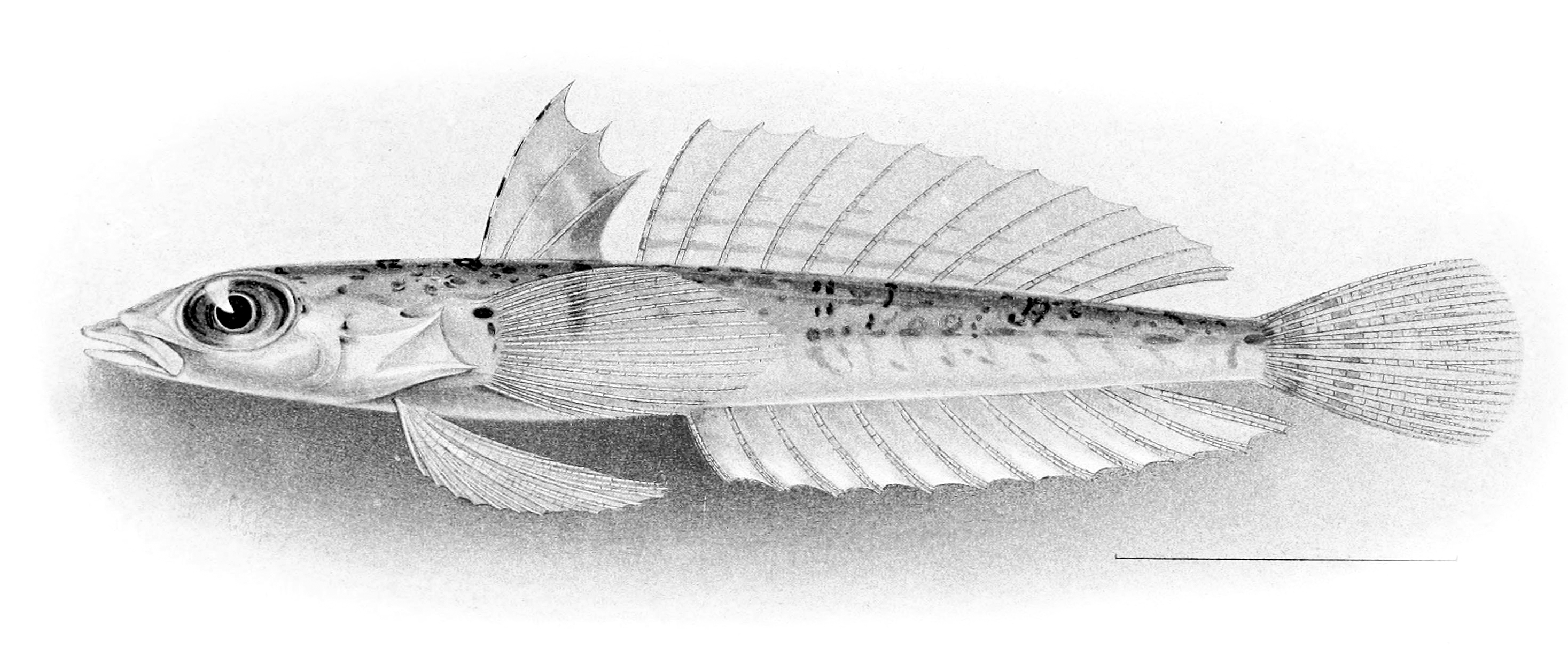
- Draconetta xenica

Scientific classification
- Kingdom: Animalia
- Phylum: Chordata
- Class: Actinopterygii
- Order: Syngnathiformes
- Suborder: Callionymoidei
- Family: Draconettidae; Jordan & Fowler, 1903

Genera
- Centrodraco; Draconetta

= Draconettidae =

Family of fishes

The Draconettidae, slope dragonets, are a small family (about 12-14 species) of fish in the order Perciformes. They are found in temperate to tropical waters of the Atlantic, Indian and western Pacific Oceans. They are closely related to, and appear similar to, the fish of the Callionymidae. They are small fish, the largest species reaching 12 cm (4.7 in) long. Like the callionymids, they are bottom-dwelling fish, and usually sexually dimorphic.

== Ecology and behavior ==
Not much is known about the ecology of slope dragonets. The larvae are planktonic, while adults live in the benthic zone on soft bottoms from the edge of the outer continental shelf and on seamounts down to around 600 m (2,000 ft) deep.

== See also ==
- List of fish families
