= Emperor Ingyō =

19th Emperor of Japan

Emperor Ingyō 允恭天皇
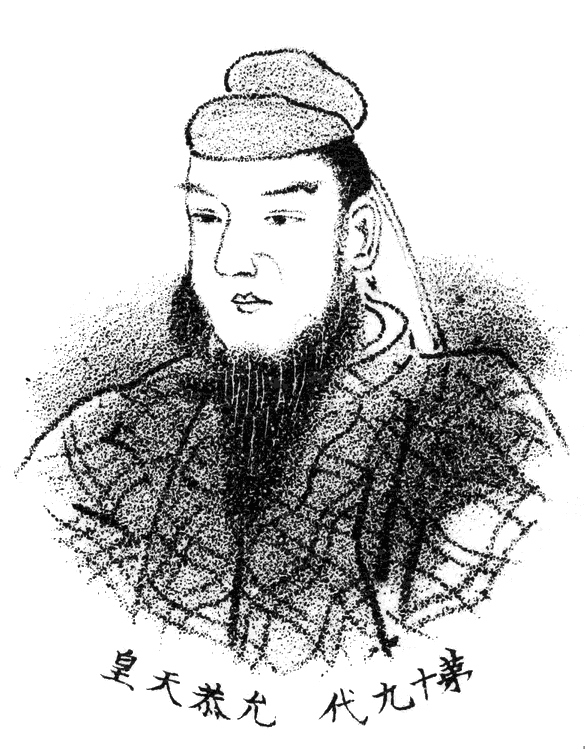

Emperor of Japan
- Reign: 412–453 (traditional)
- Predecessor: Hanzei
- Successor: Ankō
- Born: 373–375 (Note: Emperor Ingyō's exact year of birth and age at death is debatable among sources. Historian William George Aston mentions that Ingyō lived to the age of 78 as recorded by the Kojiki. While academic Richard Ponsonby-Fane remarked that "80" was the generally accepted age of death at the time (c.1915).)
- Died: 453 (aged 78–80)
- Burial: Ega no Naganu no kita no misasagi (恵我長野北陵) (Osaka)
- Spouse: Oshisaka no Ōnakatsuhime
- Issue among others...: Prince Kinashi no Karu; Emperor Ankō; Emperor Yūryaku
Posthumous name
- Chinese-style shigō: Emperor Ingyō (允恭天皇) Japanese-style shigō: Oasazuma-wakugo-no-sukune no Sumeramikoto (雄朝津間稚子宿禰天皇)
- House: Imperial House of Japan
- Father: Emperor Nintoku
- Mother: Iwano-hime
- Religion: Shinto

Emperor Ingyō (允恭天皇, Ingyō-tennō) was the 19th Emperor of Japan, according to the traditional order of succession. Both the Kojiki, and the Nihon Shoki (collectively known as the Kiki) recorded events that took place during Ingyō's alleged lifetime. No firm dates can be assigned to this Emperor's life or reign, but he is conventionally considered to have reigned from 410 to 453.

While the location of Ingyō's grave (if any) is unknown, he is traditionally venerated at a memorial Shinto tomb.

== Protohistoric narrative ==
The Japanese have traditionally accepted this sovereign's historical existence, and a mausoleum (misasagi) for Ingyō is currently maintained. The following information available is taken from the pseudo-historical Kojiki and Nihon Shoki, which are collectively known as Kiki (記紀) or Japanese chronicles. These chronicles include legends and myths, as well as potential historical facts that have since been exaggerated and/or distorted over time. It's recorded in the Kiki that Ingyō was born to Princess Iwa (磐之媛命, Iwa no hime no Mikoto) somewhere between 373 and 375 AD and was given the name Oasazuma Wakugo no Sukune (雄朝津間稚子宿禰). He was the fourth son of Emperor Nintoku, making him the youngest brother of Richū and Hanzei. After the death of his brother Hanzei in 410 AD Oasazuma was approached by ministers who had unanimously chosen him as the next Emperor. Oasazuma declined the offer stating that his brothers had "despised him as a fool". He also called himself "unlucky" as he claimed to be suffering from an unmentioned paralyzing illness.

After more than two years had passed, Oasazuma was finally persuaded by his favorite concubine Oshisaka no Ōnakatsuhime to accept the throne. Oasazuma was formally enthroned as Emperor Ingyō and his concubine became the next Kōgō. Sometime in early 414 an envoy was sent to Silla and procured a physician for the ailing Emperor. The physician attributed the problem to Ingyō's legs and was able to cure him in August of that year. In 415 AD, Ingyō reformed the system of family and clan names. This had been an ongoing issue as many families either gave false names or used a clan title with a ranking they hadn't earned. In the middle of 416 AD, an earthquake hit Japan which disrupted the "temporary" burial process of Emperor Hanzei.

Sometime in the winter of 418 AD, empress Oshisaka no Ōnakatsuhime unintentionally introduced her husband to her younger sister at a banquet. Emperor Ingyō fell deeply in love and sent a messenger afterwards to summon her. He learned that the woman's name was "Otohime" ("youngest princess"), but was given the designation of "Sotohori Iratsume" ("clothing pass maiden" (Note: This name comes from the way her "beauty" shone through her clothes.)) by local men for her beauty. Otohime initially refused to comply as she didn't want to hurt her sister's feelings. Not wanting to face punishment for disobeying, the messenger stayed with Otohime until she agreed to come. Oshisaka was not pleased by this and refused to let Otohime into the Imperial palace. Ingyō thus built Otohime a separate residence nearby where he often sneaked off to.

Empress Oshisaka no Ōnakatsuhime bore Ingyō a total of nine children (5 sons and 4 daughters). In 434 AD Ingyō chose to name his first son Kinashi no Karu as Crown Prince. This was unknowingly a controversial choice as Kinashi was later accused of an incestuous relationship with his sister, Princess Karu no Ōiratsume. Ingyō couldn't punish his son due to the title he had bestowed upon him, so instead chose an indirect approach by banishing his daughter Karu no Ōiratsume to Iyo. When Emperor Ingyō died sometime in 453 AD, the king of Silla grieved so much that he presented Japan with 80 musicians to comfort Ingyo's soul. Kinashi no Karu meanwhile faced a challenge as his younger brother Anaho was favored to be heir apparent.

== Historical assessment ==
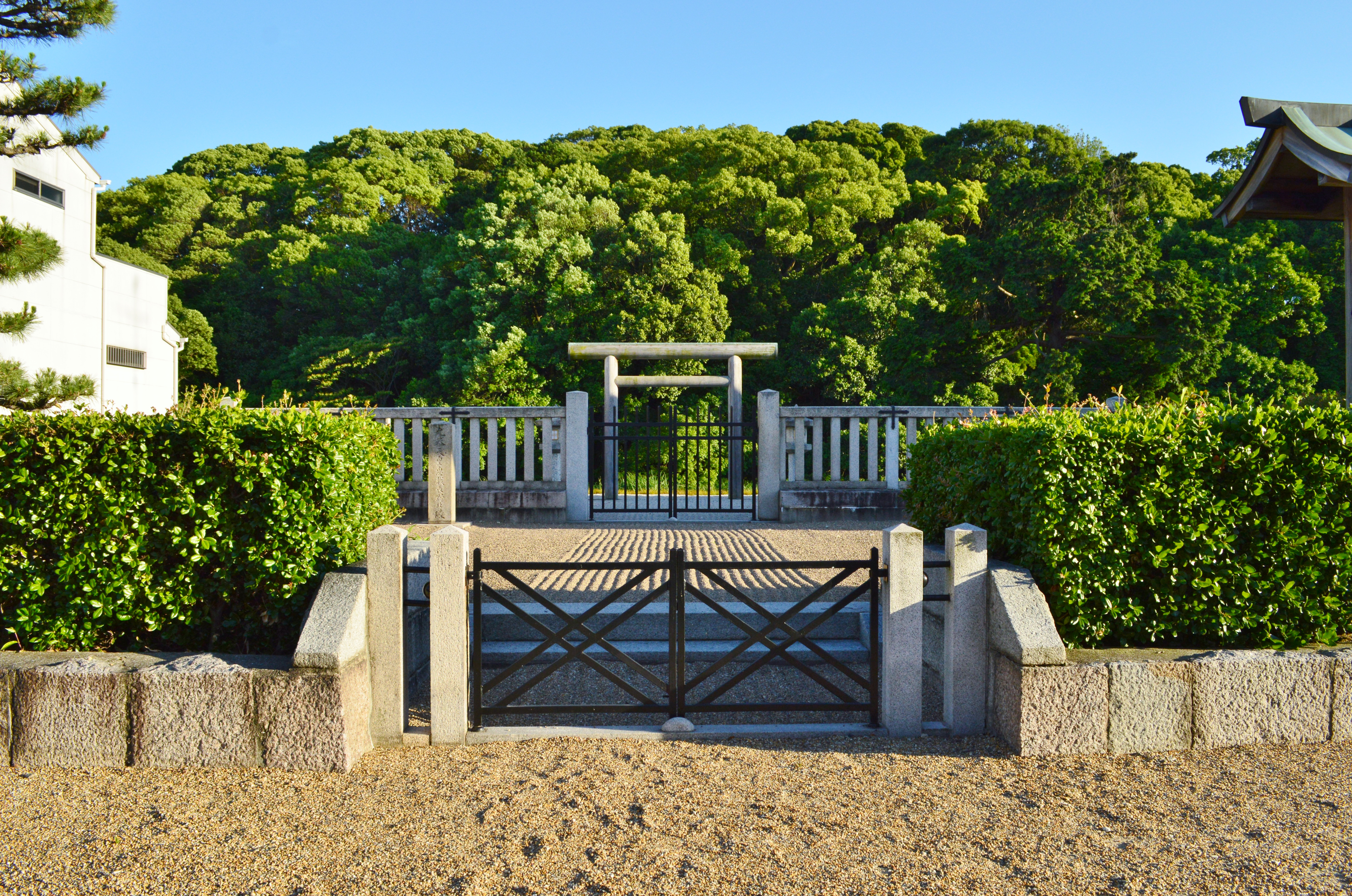
Ichinoyama Kofun in Fujiidera.

Ingyō is regarded by historians as a ruler during the early 5th century whose existence is generally accepted as fact. Scholar Francis Brinkley lists Emperor Ingyō under "Protohistoric sovereigns" whose reign was overshadowed by an affair and scandal regarding his son. Other scholars identify Ingyō with King Sai in the Book of Song. This would have been a king of Japan (referred to as Wa by contemporary Chinese scholars) who is said to have sent messengers to the Liu Song dynasty at least twice, in 443 and 451. However, there is no record in the Kiki of messengers being sent.

=== Titles and dating ===
There is no evidence to suggest that the title tennō was used during the time to which Ingyō's reign has been assigned. Rather, it was presumably Sumeramikoto or Amenoshita Shiroshimesu Ōkimi (治天下大王), meaning "the great king who rules all under heaven". An alternate title could have also been Yamato Daiō (ヤマト大王)/Taikun (大君) "Great King of Yamato". The name Ingyō-tennō was more than likely assigned to him posthumously by later generations. His name might have been regularized centuries after the lifetime ascribed to Ingyō, possibly during the time in which legends about the origins of the imperial dynasty were compiled as the chronicles known today as the Kojiki.

Outside of the Kiki, the reign of Emperor Kinmei (Note: The 29th Emperor) (c. 509 – 571 AD) is the first for which contemporary historiography has been able to assign verifiable dates. The conventionally accepted names and dates of the early Emperors were not confirmed as "traditional" though, until the reign of Emperor Kanmu (Note: Kanmu was the 50th sovereign of the imperial dynasty) between 737 and 806 AD.

=== Events during reign ===
Early on in his reign, Emperor Ingyō chose to send envoys to Korea for medical assistance. Brinkley took note of this and stated that Korea was evidently regarded as the "home of healing science". He also attributed the "many other" arts which were borrowed from China. In regard to reforms, Sholar William George Aston notes in his translation of the Nihon Shoki that when Ingyō reformed the system of family and clan names, it would have only applied to dominant caste. At the time the general populace of Japan kept their personal names and "cared little for geopolitics". Emperor Ingyō's later affair with "Otohime" is regarded as important by Brinkley as it illustrates the manners and customs at the time. He also suggests that the "atmosphere of loose morality" was in part responsible for Kinashi no Karu's incestuous relationship.

It is agreed upon by Basil Hall Chamberlain's translation of the Kojiki, and Aston's translation of the Nihon Shoki that Prince Kinashi no Karu was probably appointed crown prince during his father's lifetime. At the time, marriage between children of the same father had always been allowed as long as the mothers involved were different. Marriage of children of the same mother of whom Kinashi no Karu was guilty of was considered incest. Aston notes in his translation of the Nihon Shoki that it's doubtful Karu no Ōiratsume was banished by her father. Historically women have always been more lightly punished than men for the same offense, and "the particular character of the fault in this case makes such a discrimination all the more reasonable".

Francis Brinkley comments that four facts present themselves during Emperor Ingyō's reign: "Men wore wristbands and garters to which grelots were attached, that a high value was set for pearls, that metal was used for the construction of great man's gates, and the first earthquake is said to have been experienced in 416 AD". The latter of these things allegedly leveled the Imperial Palace at Kyoto from the severity of the Earth's tremors. Modern sources have since questioned the reliability of this "first earthquake", opting instead to recognize another that took place in Nara prefecture on May 28, 599 during the reign of Empress Suiko.

=== Gravesite ===
While the actual site of Ingyō's grave is not known, this regent is traditionally venerated at a memorial Shinto shrine in Fujiidera Osaka. The Imperial Household Agency designates this location as Ingyō's mausoleum/kofun-type Imperial tomb. Formally, this tomb is called Emperor Ingyō's misasagi (恵我長野北陵,, Ega no nagano no kita no misasagi), but is also given the name Ichinoyama Kofun (市ノ山古墳（市野山古墳). Another burial candidate for Emperor Ingyō's is the Tsudoshiroyama Kofun (津堂城山古墳), which is also located in Fujiidera. Ingyō is also enshrined at the Imperial Palace along with other emperors and members of the Imperial Family at the Three Palace Sanctuaries.

== Consorts and children ==
=== Spouse/Concubine ===
Position	Name	Father	Issue
Empress (Kōgō)	Oshisaka no Ōnakatsuhime (忍坂大中姫)	Prince Wakanuke no Futamata (稚野毛二派皇子)	• Prince Kinashi no Karu (木梨軽皇子) • Princess Nagata no Ōiratsume (名形大娘皇女) • Prince Sakai no Kurohiko (境黒彦皇子) • Prince Anaho (穴穂皇子) • Princess Karu no Ōiratsume (軽大娘皇女) • Prince Yatsuri no Shirahiko (八釣白彦皇子) • Prince Ōhatuse no Wakatakeru (大泊瀬稚武皇子) • Princess Tajima no Tachibana no Ōiratsume (但馬橘大娘皇女) • Princess Sakami (酒見皇女)
Concubine (Hi)	Otohime (弟姫) (Note: Otohime is also known as "Sotoorihime", "Sotori no Iratsume", and "Princess Karu no Oiratsume".)	Prince Wakanuke no Futamata (稚野毛二派皇子)	None

=== Issue ===
Status	Name	Comments
Prince	Prince Kinashi no Karu (木梨軽皇子)	Prince Kinashi was later defeated by Prince Anaho (see below)
Princess	Princess Nagata no Ōiratsume (名形大娘皇女)	
Prince	Prince Sakai no Kurohiko (境黒彦皇子)	Prince Sakai allegedly died sometime in 456 AD.
Prince	Prince Anaho (穴穂皇子)	Emperor Ingyō's 3rd son later became Emperor Ankō.
Princess	Princess Karu no Ōiratsume (軽大娘皇女)	"Princess Karu" and "Otohime" are synonymous in the Kojiki.
Prince	Prince Yatsuri no Shirahiko (八釣白彦皇子)	Yatsuri's lifespan was allegedly 401 to 456 AD.
Prince	Prince Ōhatuse no Wakatakeru (大泊瀬稚武皇子)	Emperor Ingyō's 5th son later became Emperor Yūryaku.
Princess	Princess Tajima no Tachibana no Ōiratsume (但馬橘大娘皇女)	
Princess	Princess Sakami (酒見皇女)	
Princess	Princess Karu no Ōiratsume (軽大娘皇女)	Synonymous with Otohime (弟姫) aka Princess Sotoorihime

== See also ==
Japanese Imperial kamon — a stylized chrysanthemum blossom

- Imperial cult
- Five kings of Wa

== Notes ==
Regnal titles
Preceded by Emperor Hanzei	Emperor of Japan: Ingyō; 412–453 (traditional dates)	Succeeded by Emperor Ankō
