= Emperor Ankō =

20th Emperor of Japan

Emperor Ankō 安康天皇
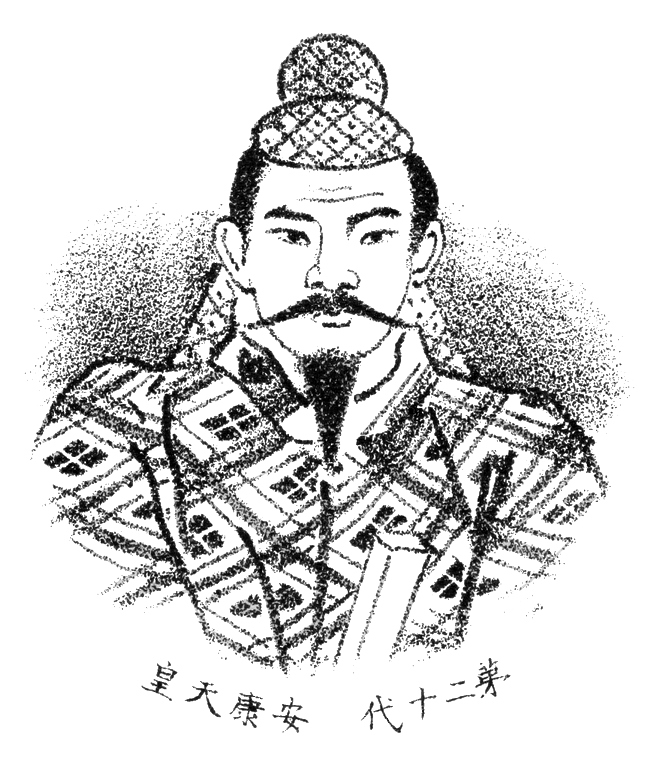

Emperor of Japan
- Reign: 453–456 (traditional)
- Predecessor: Ingyō
- Successor: Yūryaku
- Born: Anaho (穴穂); 400 (Note: There is a consensus among historians that Emperor Ankō was born in 400 AD. Alternately, there are sources that also use the year 401 AD.)
- Died: 456 (aged 56)
- Burial: Sugawara no Fushimi no nishi misasagi (菅原伏見西陵) (Nara)
- Spouse: Nakashi
Posthumous name
- Chinese-style shigō: Emperor Ankō (安康天皇) Japanese-style shigō: Anaho no Sumeramikoto (穴穂天皇)
- House: Imperial House of Japan
- Father: Emperor Ingyō
- Mother: Oshisaka no Ōnakatsuhime
- Religion: Shinto

Emperor Ankō (安康天皇, Ankō-tennō) (401 – 456) was the 20th emperor of Japan, according to the traditional order of succession.

No firm dates can be assigned to this emperor's life or reign, but he is conventionally considered to have reigned from 453 to 456.

== Protohistoric narrative ==
The Japanese have traditionally accepted this sovereign's historical existence, and a mausoleum (misasagi) for Ankō is currently maintained. The following information available is taken from the pseudo-historical Kojiki and Nihon Shoki, which are collectively known as Kiki (記紀) or Japanese chronicles. These chronicles include legends and myths, as well as potential historical facts that have since been exaggerated and/or distorted over time. It's recorded in the Kiki that Ingyō was born to Oshisaka no Ōnakatsuhime (忍坂大中姫) somewhere in 400 AD, and was given the name Anaho (穴穂). While he was the third son of Emperor Ingyō, the title of "Crown Prince" was not bestowed upon him in his father's lifetime. For this particular sovereign, the Kojiki and Nihon Shoki tell different versions of what allegedly happened in regard to Emperor Ankō's older brother Prince Kinashi no Karu.

=== War between Anaho and Kinashi ===
After Emperor Ingyō's death in 453 AD, Crown Prince Kinashi no Karu faced a mounting problem. The incestuous relationship with his sister, Princess Karu no Ōiratsume had caused the public to shun him and his retainers refused to follow. Karu chose to take up arms against his younger brother Anaho (穴穂) as his retainers had instead given their allegiance to him. Prince Anaho (穴穂) responded with a force of his own which prompted Karu to flee and take refuge at a noble family's residence. From this point on, the Kiki splits narratives that converge again with the same fatal outcome. In the Nihon Shoki's version of events, Kinashi no Karu takes his final stand at the residence where he commits an honorary suicide. The Nihon Shoki does not say what happened to Princess Karu no Ōiratsume other than her being banished to Iyo by Emperor Ingyō during his lifetime for incest. In the Kojiki's version of events, Kinashi no Karu surrenders to his younger brother and is banished to Iyo. Karu no Ōiratsume follows him to Iyo afterwards and the two commit suicide together.

=== Reign ===
Prince Anaho (穴穂) was enthroned as Emperor Ankō towards the end of 453 AD. During this time the capital was moved to Isonokami (located in Yamoto) where the new emperor had his palace. One of Ankō's first decisions in the following year was to arrange a marriage between his younger brother, Prince Ōhatuse no Wakatakeru (大泊瀬稚武皇子), and Hatahihime, who was a sister of his uncle Prince Ookusaka (大草香皇子). Ankō dispatched his servant Ne-no-omi (根使主) to negotiate with Ookusaka, and he happily consented to the marriage. As a token of approval, he entrusted Ne-no-omi with a richly jeweled coronet to be presented to the Emperor. Unbeknownst to Ankō, his servant chose to keep the coronet for himself and lied to him by saying Ookusaka refused to comply. Ankō believed Ne-no-omi's words and infuriated with rage sent his soldiers to kill Ookusaka and take his wife Nakashi (Emperor Richū’s daughter) as his Kogo. Hatahihime was then married to Ōhatuse in accordance with the Emperor's wishes. Aside from his eventual demise, there aren't any other noteworthy events during Ankō's reign.

=== Death ===
Ankō married Nakashi whom he "loved deeply" in 455 AD, but before this time she already had a son named Mayowa no Ōkimi (Prince Mayowa). The young prince (6 years old at the time) was able to escape punishment on "his mother's account" and was brought up in the royal palace. Sometime in the Autumn of 456 AD, Emperor Ankō confided to Nakashi that he was worried one day Mayowa may seek to avenge his father's death. Mayowa overheard this remark and crept to the side of his step-father who was asleep in Nakashi's lap. He then proceeded to cut off Ankō's head with his own sword. At the time of his death, Ankō was 56 years old, had no children of his own, and, according to the Nihon Shoki was buried sometime in 459 AD. Prince Ōhatuse no Wakatakeru (Emperor Ingyō's youngest son) became the next Emperor towards the end of 456 AD after killing Prince Mayowa and the rest of his competition.

== Historical assessment ==
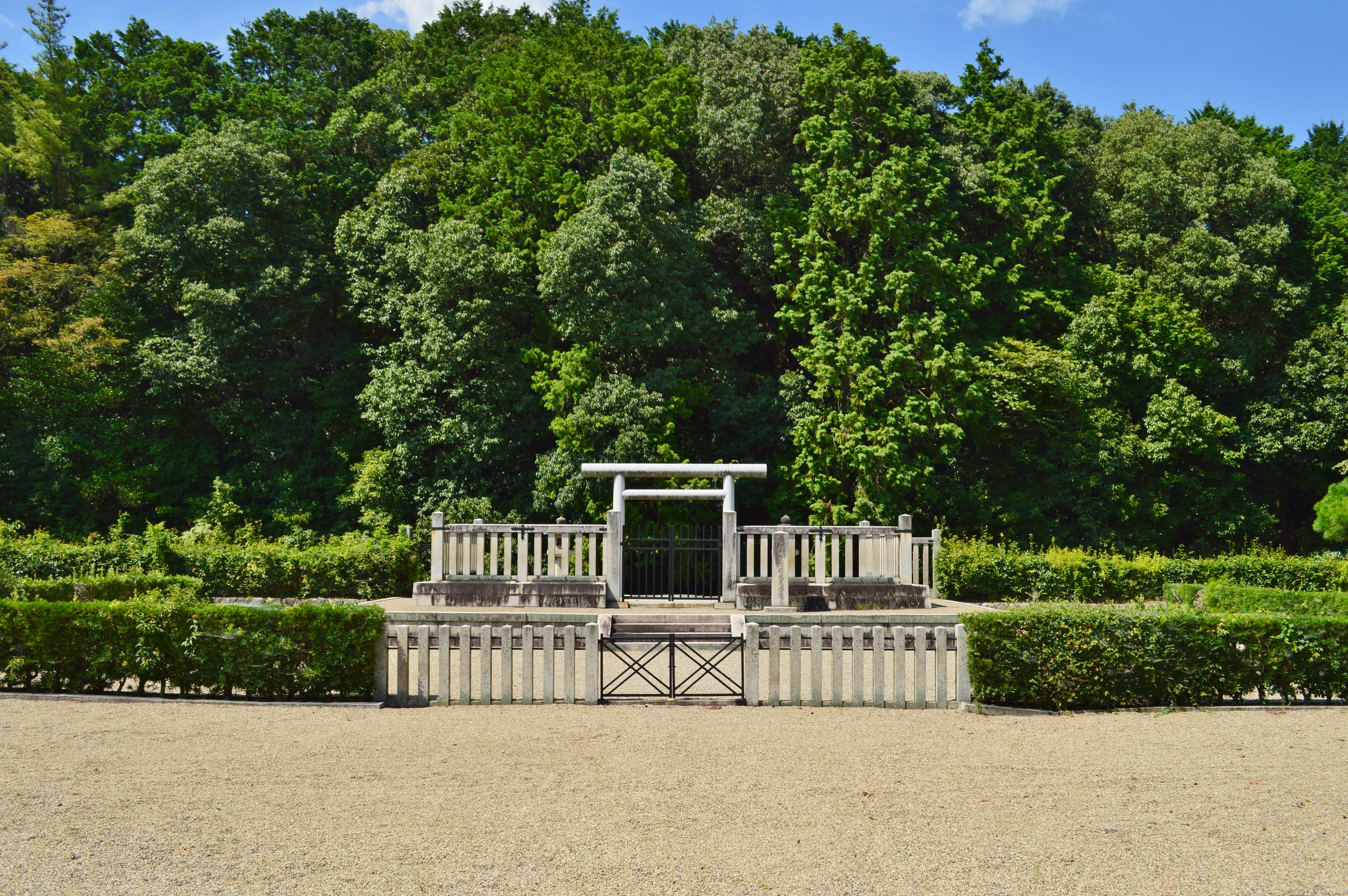
Emperor Ankō's misasagi

Ankō is regarded by historians as a ruler during the mid 5th century whose existence is generally accepted as fact. Scholar Francis Brinkley lists Emperor Ankō under "Protohistoric sovereigns" whose reign was "a discreditable page of Japanese History". Other scholars identify Ankō with King Kō in the Book of Song. This would have been a king of Japan (referred to as Wa by contemporary Chinese scholars) who is said to have sent tribute to the Southern Dynasty of China in 462, during the reign of Emperor Taiwu of the Northern Wei. It also mentions that King Kō was appointed as the "General of the East". However, there is no record in the Kiki of any tribute being sent during this time.

=== Titles and dating ===
There is no evidence to suggest that the title tennō was used during the time to which Ankō's reign has been assigned. Rather, it was presumably Sumeramikoto or Amenoshita Shiroshimesu Ōkimi (治天下大王), meaning "the great king who rules all under heaven". An alternate title could have also been ヤマト大王/大君 "Great King of Yamato". The name Ankō-tennō was more than likely assigned to him posthumously by later generations. His name might have been regularized centuries after the lifetime ascribed to Ankō, possibly during the time in which legends about the origins of the imperial dynasty were compiled as the chronicles known today as the Kojiki.

Outside of the Kiki, the reign of Emperor Kinmei (Note: The 29th Emperor) (c. 509 – 571 AD) is the first for which contemporary historiography has been able to assign verifiable dates. The conventionally accepted names and dates of the early Emperors were not confirmed as "traditional" though, until the reign of Emperor Kanmu (Note: Kanmu was the 50th sovereign of the imperial dynasty) between 737 and 806 AD.

=== Events during reign ===
Emperor Ankō's short 3-year reign is largely confined to an event that had deadly consequences. Scholar William George Aston notes in his translation of the Nihon Shoki that Hatahihime and Prince Ookusaka (大草香皇子) are implied in the Shukai as grandchildren rather than children of Emperor Nintoku. He states that the "obvious explanation" is that the "chronicle is entirely untrustworthy". At the point where Emperor Ankō's servant Ne-no-omi (根使主) relays false information regarding Prince Ookusaka's alleged rejection, the emperor had no reason to doubt him. Frank Brinkley notes that it was "not customary in those days" to conduct investigations (in this case a servant).

The exact account of Emperor Ankō's death is also questionable given that a child could conceive or commit such a thing. Scholar Francis Brinkley suggests that Empress Nakashi played a role in her husband's death. He also suggests that the answer might lie with Prince Ōhatuse no Wakatakeru (大泊瀬稚武皇子) who later became Emperor Yūryaku. Brinkley argues that if Ōhatuse had no issue with killing several of his family members to obtain the throne, then there is no reason why he wouldn't have started with the reigning emperor.

=== Gravesite ===
While the actual site of Ankō's grave is not known, this regent is traditionally venerated at a memorial Shinto shrine at the ruins of Horai Castle in Nara City. The Imperial Household Agency designates this location as Ankō's mausoleum/kofun-type Imperial tomb. Formally, this tomb is called Emperor Ankō's misasagi (菅原伏見西陵, Sugawara no Fushimi no nishi misasagi), but is also given the name Kojo No. 1 Mound (古城1号墳). Another possible burial theory involves the Horaisan Kofun (宝来山古墳), whose owner remains unknown. Ankō is also enshrined at the Imperial Palace along with other emperors and members of the Imperial Family at the Three Palace Sanctuaries.

== See also ==
Japanese Imperial kamon — a stylized chrysanthemum blossom

- Five kings of Wa

== Notes ==
Regnal titles
Preceded by Emperor Ingyō	Emperor of Japan: Ankō; 453–456 (traditional dates)	Succeeded by Emperor Yūryaku
