= El Kantara Province =

El Kantara Province ولاية القنطرة ⴰⴳⴻⵣⴷⵓ ⵏ ⵍⵇⴻⵏⵟⵔⴰ
- Province
- Map of El Kantara Province
- Coordinates: 35°13′00″N 5°42′37″E
- Country: Algeria
- Created: 2026
- Capital: El Kantara

Area
  - Total: 1,400 km^{2} (540 sq mi)

Population (2008)
  - Total: 43,110
  - Density: 31/km^{2} (80/sq mi)
- Time zone: UTC+01 (CET)
- Area code: +213
- ISO 3166 code: DZ-07
- Districts: 3
- Municipalities: 5

El Kantara Province (Arabic: ولاية القنطرة, romanized: Wilāyat al-Qanṭara) is a province (wilaya) in eastern Algeria, with El Kantara as its provincial capital. It was created in 2026 by separation from Biskra Province.

The small province covers an area of 1,400 km² and lies in the transition zone between the densely populated north and the sparsely populated south. Around 43,000 people lived in the province at the 2008 census, giving it a population density of 31 inhabitants per square kilometre.

== Administrative divisions ==
The wilaya of El Kantara is divided into 5 communes, grouped into 3 districts (daïras).

| Daïras | Communes | |
| Daïras | Name | Pop. 2008 |
|---|---|---|
| El Kantara | El Kantara | 11,415 |
| El Kantara | Aïn Zaatout | 3,693 |
| Djemourah | Djemourah | 12,574 |
| Djemourah | Branis | 4,273 |
| El Outaya | El Outaya | 11,155 |
