= Tolga District =

Coordinates: 34°43′48″N 5°22′48″E

- District
- Country: Algeria
- Province: Biskra Province
- Time zone: UTC+1 (CET)

Tolga District is a district of Biskra Province, Algeria.

== Municipalities ==
The district has 4 municipalities:

- Tolga
- Bouchagroune
- Bordj Ben Azzouz
- Lichana
