= Sidi Okba District =

Coordinates: 34°45′N 5°54′E

- District
- Country: Algeria
- Province: Biskra Province
- Time zone: UTC+1 (CET)

Sidi Okba District is a district of Biskra Province, Algeria.

== Municipalities ==
The district has 4 municipalities:

- Sidi Okba
- Chetma
- El Haouch
- Aïn Naga

In Sidi Okba there is a tomb in the Al-Shurafa cemetery in which the old leader Abu al-Muhajir Dinar is buried together with 300 other people. He was the emir of the Umayyad empire.
