= Zeribet El Oued District =

Coordinates: 34°41′N 6°31′E

- District
- Country: Algeria
- Province: Biskra Province
- Time zone: UTC+1 (CET)

Zeribet El Oued District is a district of Biskra Province, Algeria.

== Municipalities ==
The district has 4 municipalities:

- Zeribet El Oued
- Khenguet Sidi Nadjil
- El Feidh
- Meziraa
