= Zaatcha =

Oasis in Biskra Province, Algeria

Coordinates: 34°43′N 5°24′E

Zaatcha, also spelled Za'âtsha, is an oasis in Biskra Province, Algeria. It is located on National Road 46, between Biskra and Bou Saâda, between Tolga and Lichana, about 30 km west of Biskra.

== History ==
Zaatcha is chiefly known for the Siege of Zaatcha, fought mainly in November 1849 during the French conquest of Algeria. The battle opposed troops of the French Army of Africa, commanded by General Émile Herbillon, to insurgents led by Sheikh Ahmed Bouziane.

The final assault took place on 26 November 1849 and ended in a massacre. The total death toll has been estimated at about 3,000 people, roughly divided between the two sides.

== See also ==
- French Algeria
