= Lioua =

- Commune and town
- map of wilaya of Biskra
- Interactive map of Lioua
- Country: Algeria
- Province: Biskra Province

Area
  - Total: 24,320 km^{2} (9,390 sq mi)

Population (2008)
  - Total: 21,416
  - Density: 8,806/km^{2} (22,810/sq mi)
- Time zone: UTC+1 (CET)
- Postal code: 07033
- Area code: (+213) 033

Lioua (Arabic: ليوة) is a town and commune in Ourlal District, of Biskra Province, Algeria. According to the 1998 census it had a population of 15,960, but this had grown to 21,416 in 2008.

The town is on the edge of the Sahara, and the climate is semi-arid. Lioua sits aside the Oued Djedi river that feeds into the Chott Melghir and is 10 km south of Tolga, and like most of that area is known for the production of date palms.
