= Ourlal District =

Coordinates: 34°39′28″N 5°31′18″E

- District
- Country: Algeria
- Province: Biskra Province
- Time zone: UTC+1 (CET)

Ourlal District is a district of Biskra Province, Algeria.

== Municipalities ==
The district has 5 municipalities:

- Ourlala
- Oumache
- M'Lili
- Mekhadma
- Lioua
