= Legis Volumni =

Legis Volumni Lioua
- Commune and town
- Country: Algeria
- Province: Biskra Province
- Time zone: UTC+1 (CET)

Legis Volumni was a Roman and Byzantine era town in the Roman province and Berber kingdom of Numidia in the Maghreb. It served as an ancient Latin Catholic diocese. The town is identified with ruins near the modern city of Lioua in Algeria.

== Bishopric ==
Legis Volumini was also the seat of an ancient bishopric, which remains a titular see of the Roman Catholic church.

Known Bishops

- Francis Paul McHugh (August 1967 – May 2003)
- Juan Tomás Oliver Climent (27 February 2004 – current)
