= Gemellae =

Archaeological site in Algeria

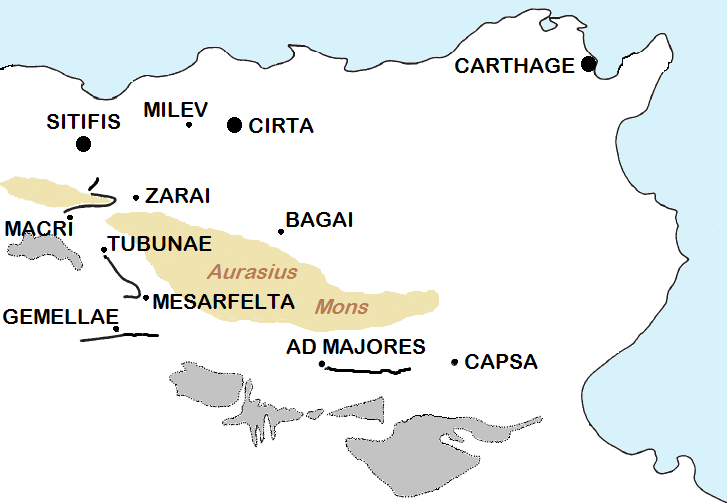
- Gemellae was located on the "Limes romanus" called Fossatum Africae

- Location within Algeria
- 34.636598°N 5.522904°E
- Location: Algeria
- Region: Biskra Province

Gemellae was a Roman fort and associated camp on the fringe of the Sahara Desert in what is today part of Algeria. It is now an archaeological site, 25 km south and 19 km west of Biskra, and 5 km southwest of the present-day village of M'Lili with which it probably shares an original Berber name. It was connected by military Roman road to Castellum Dimmidi and Capsa.

== History ==
Apparently there was a fortification at Gemellae prior to the coming of the Romans. Pliny the Elder recounts that when Lucius Cornelius Balbus celebrated his victory over the Garamantes of the Sahara in 19 BC, one of the conquests feted in the parade through Rome was that of Milgis Gemmella, described as an oppidum (usually meaning fortified settlement).

The Romans seem to have then occupied the site and made it one of the southernmost outposts, marking the limes or boundary of the Roman Empire.

The earliest epigraph retrieved from the site is an inscription for a statue of Emperor Hadrian, in about the year 126 AD, by a cohors equitata (equestrian regiment) originating from Chalcis in Syria. The presence of this army unit in Africa is attested by inscriptions elsewhere dating from as early as 78 AD and as late as 164 AD.

A second very large dedication to Hadrian, which faced the central courtyard, dates from 132 AD. The name of the Legion to which the regiment belonged was hammered off, presumably because of the withdrawal of their legion for disciplinary reasons, then re-inscribed, presumably following the return of the regiment in 253 AD. The hypothesis is that the inscription of 126 AD, for a small-sized statue, represents the establishment of a 'provisional' camp, and that the inscription of 132 marks the completion of the greater fort.

Also present in the sacellum (chapel where the vexillae or standards and ensigns of the legion were stored) were statues of Antoninus Pius, Pertinax and Gordian, the latter two with inscriptions indicating the presence of the Ala I Pannoniorum (a cavalry unit raised by the Emperor Gordian). Altars to the Dii Campestres (army gods) were dedicated by Marcus Celerius Augendus, prefect of the Pannonians, and by Titus Aurelius Aurelianus, prefect of another cavalry unit from Thrace. It is likely that the Pannonians were substitutes for the Legio III Augusta regiment until its reinstatement in 253 AD.

The establishment of the fort and surrounding settlement is probably linked to the construction of the Fossatum Africae. Gemellae is the largest of several forts in the area which follow the line of the Fossatum. In the 5th century there is still mention of a sector of the limes called Gemellensis just prior to the Vandal invasion. Other than that, the history of Gemellae after 253 AD remains uncertain.

No Christian artefacts have been recovered, so there is no current archaeological evidence for a Byzantine presence. However, Justinian is known to have ordered Belisarius in 534 AD to restore the fortifications of the limes as they were before the Vandal invasion. The 6th-century historian Procopius mentions a Meleon as one of those forts rebuilt as a result, which may have been Gemellae. The 9th-century Arab historian Khalifa ibn Khayyat relates that when Abu al-Muhajir Dinar was emir of Ifriqiya (c. 675–682) he conquered Mila which may have been Gemellae.

Gemellae has now been reclaimed by the desert, and excavators have complained about the continually blowing sand. The remains of the fort are known locally as al-Qasba (casbah, exactly a fort).

== Archaeology ==
The great fort (praetorium or General Headquarters) of Gemellae is rectangular with sides oriented to the cardinal directions, constructed in a manner common to most Roman castra. It measures 150 metres (490 ft) north to south and 190 m east to west. For the most part, the masonry wall was about 3 metres (9.8 ft) thick, using stone from a quarry 14 kilometres (8.7 mi) distant. However, the fort's corners were rounded and reinforced to a thickness of 4.85 metres (15.9 ft). Just outside the masonry wall was an earth wall (vallum).

There was a gate in each side, and a number of towers. The towers were situated at each corner and at each gate, also the short sides of the fort had 2 additional ones and the long sides 3, i.e. one tower every 30 metres (98 ft), compared with one tower per 60 metres (200 ft) at the Legion's headquarters at Lambaesis. The towers had no external bastions, interiorly they reduced the wall thickness by about 1.5 metres (4 ft 11 in).

The interior courtyard was entirely paved over, and the walls and columns painted. The oldest layer of paint was a reddish purple, later covered by a cream base on which were painted various designs. The columns, for example, were painted with fruiting grapevines.

Outside the fort, the town was surrounded by a vallum at a distance of 700–800 metres (2,300–2,600 ft) from the centre of the praetorium. Just outside the fort was a small almost circular amphitheatre with three stages of seating and an internal diameter of 12.5 metres (41 ft). 75 metres (246 ft) northeast of the fort, the ruin of a temple to the Dii Campestres or army gods was found. Pieces of painted fresco, including a half-size head of a deity, were recovered, along with offerings such as sea-shells and gazelle horns.

At a distance of 700 metres (2,300 ft) (hence outside the town vallum) was another temple, of mudbrick on a masonry base. A ciborium contained a small sculptured stone lion seated before a 30 centimetres (12 in) statuette of a goddess in richly painted terracotta. The goddess held a cornucopia and was either a personification of Africa, or the goddess Cybele. In the interior courtyard were two stelae representing the sacrifice of a ram to Saturn. Many vases and amphorae were found in the temple, holding ashes and burnt fragments of animal bones. In the area around the temple were also found roughly fashioned approximately life-sized prone human figures which may have been used to incinerate animal sacrifices.

== See also ==
- Mauretania Caesariensis
- Caesarea
- Auzia
- Altava
- Rapidum
- Cirta
- Thamugadi
- Lambaesis
- Castellum Dimmidi
- List of cultural assets of Algeria

== Select bibliography ==
- J. Baradez (1949). Gemellae. Un camp d’Hadrien et une ville aux confins sahariens aujourd’hui ensevelis sous les sables. Revue Africaine v. 93 p. 1-24.
- A. Benabbès: "Les premiers raids arabes en Numidie byzantine: questions toponymiques." In Identités et Cultures dans l'Algérie Antique, University of Rouen, 2005 (ISBN 2-87775-391-3)
- Speidel M.P. (1991). "The Shrine of the Dii Campestres at Gemellae", Antiquites africaines 27, 111–118.
- P. Trousset (2002). Les limites sud de la réoccupation Byzantine. Antiquité Tardive v. 10, p. 143-150.
