= Djemorah District =

Coordinates: 35°04′N 5°50′E

- District
- Country: Algeria
- Province: Biskra Province
- Time zone: UTC+1 (CET)

Djemorah District or Djemourah District is a district of Biskra Province, Algeria.

== Municipalities ==
The district has 2 municipalities:

- Djemorah
- Branis
