= Foughala District =

Coordinates: 27.6667°N 0.3000°E

- District
- Country: Algeria
- Province: Biskra Province
- Time zone: UTC+1 (CET)

Foughala District is a district of Biskra Province, Algeria.

== Municipalities ==
The district has 2 municipalities:

- Foughala
- El Ghrous
