= Biskra District =

Coordinates: 34°51′N 5°44′E

- District
- Country: Algeria
- Province: Biskra Province
- Time zone: UTC+1 (CET)

Biskra District is a district of Biskra Province, Algeria.

== Municipalities ==
The district has 2 municipalities:

- Biskra
- El Hadjeb
