= Biskra Airport =

Mohamed Khider Airport مطار بسكرة - محمد خيضر (Arabic)
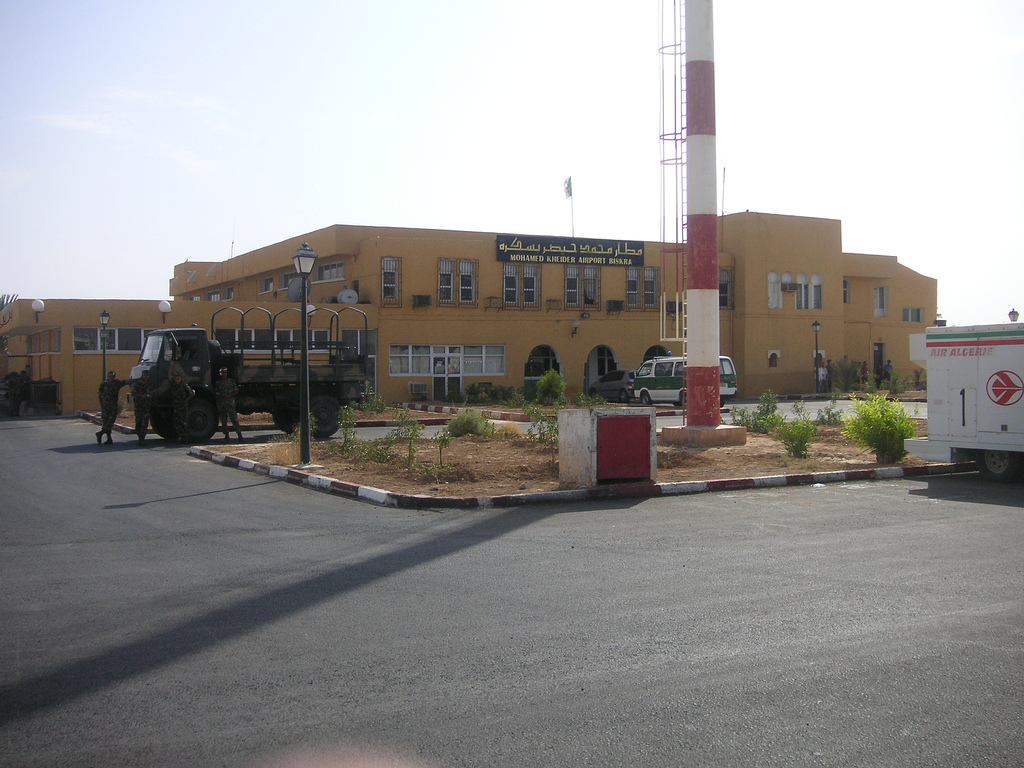
- IATA: BSK; ICAO: DAUB

Summary
- Airport type: Public
- Operator: EGSA Constantine
- Serves: Biskra
- Location: Oumache, Algeria
- Elevation AMSL: 88 m / 289 ft
- Coordinates: 34°48′06″N 05°44′30″E

Map
- Location of airport in Algeria

Runways
Direction	Length		Surface
Direction	m	ft	Surface
13/31	2,900	9,514	Asphalt

Statistics (2020)
- Passenger volume: 29,154
- Source: Algerian AIP Landings.com, ACI's 2013 World Airport Traffic Report

Mohamed Khider Airport or Biskra Ouakda Airport (IATA: BSK, ICAO: DAUB) is an airport in Algeria, located approximately 12 km north-northeast of Oumache; about 200 km south-southwest of Constantine.

== History ==
During World War II, the airport was known as "Biskra Airfield". It was a major United States Twelfth Air Force base of operations during the North African campaign against the German Afrika Korps. Known combat units assigned to the airfield were: 97th Bombardment Group B-17 Flying Fortress (14 December 1942 – 8 February 1943); 301st Bombardment Group B-17 Flying Fortress (16 December 1942 – 17 January 1943); 1st Fighter Group P-38 Lightning (24 December 1942 – 8 February 1943); HQ, 5th Bombardment Wing (January–March 1943).

== Airlines and destinations ==
The following airlines operate regular scheduled and charter flights at Biskra Airport:

Airlines	Destinations
Air Algérie	Algiers, Lyon, Paris–Orly
Tassili Airlines	Algiers
Transavia	Paris-Orly

== See also ==
- List of airports in Algeria
- Boeing B-17 Flying Fortress Units of the Mediterranean Theater of Operations
