= Chott Melrhir =

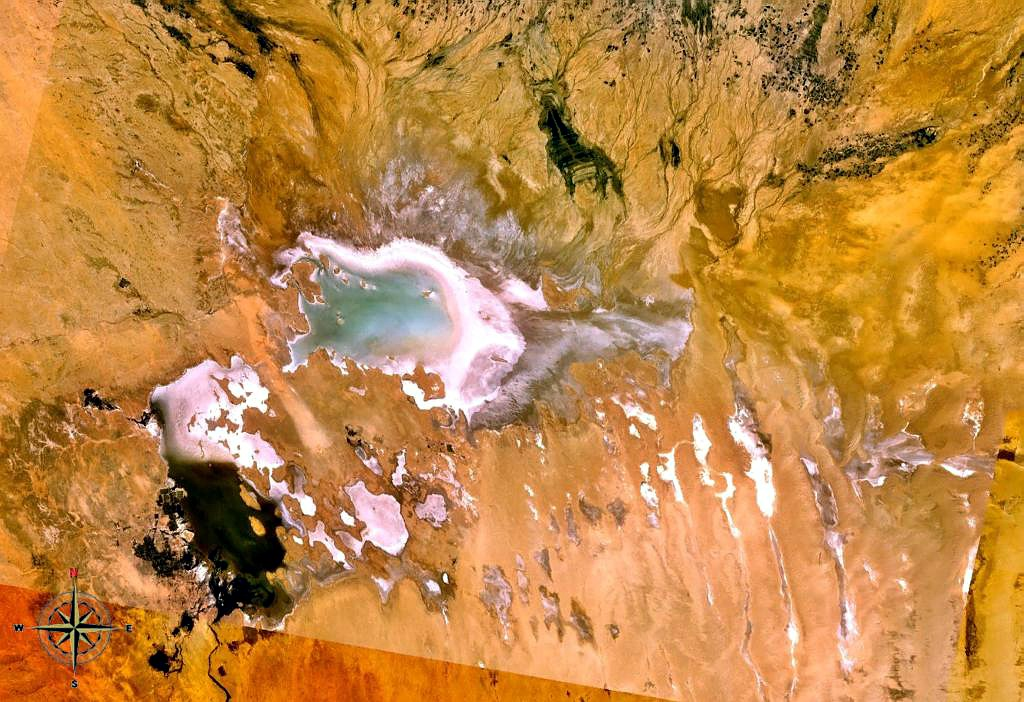
- View from space. Note that most of the lake is already dried up in this picture.

- Location within Algeria
- Coordinates: 34°20′N 6°20′E
- Type: Endorheic salt lake
- Catchment area: 68,750 km^{2} (26,540 sq mi)
- Basin countries: Algeria
- Surface area: 6,700 km^{2} (2,600 sq mi)

Ramsar Wetland
- Official name: Chott Melghir
- Designated: 4 June 2003
- Reference no.: 1296

Chott Melrhir (Arabic: شط ملغيغ), also known as Chott Melghir or Chott Melhir and Lake Tritonis in ancient myths, is an endorheic chott-kind of salt lake in northeastern Algeria. It is the westernmost part of a series of depressions which extend from the Gulf of Gabès into the Sahara. It was formerly known as Lake Tritonis. They were created between Miocene and Early Pleistocene as a result of compression accompanying the formation of the Atlas Mountains. With the maximum area of about 6,700 km^{2} (2,600 sq mi), it is the largest lake in Algeria. It lies almost entirely below sea level and contains the lowest point in Algeria, −40 meters (−130 feet). Its size varies over the year and is usually larger than 130 km (81 mi) from east to west. The nearby cities are Biskra (60 km north-west), El Oued and Touggourt (85 km south).

== Hydrology, geology and geography ==
During the rain season in winter, the lake is filled by numerous wadi (periodically drying rivers), mostly from north and north-west. The largest of them are the Djedi and Arab running from west to east down the slopes of Aurès Mountains. Others include Abiod, Beggour Mitta, Biskra, Bir Az Atrous, Cheria, Demmed, Dermoun, Derradj, Djedeida, Djemorah, Halail, Horchane, Ittel, Mechra, Melh, Mzi, Messad, Oum El Ksob, Soukies, Tadmit and Zeribet. In summer, the lake and most of the rivers feeding it dry out, and Chott Melrhir turns into a salt pan. The annual water evaporation varies between 9.6 and 20 km^{3}, and evaporation from soil nearby the lake can reach 14 km^{3}.

Chott Melrhir is separated from the nearby Chott Meorouane, which lies south-west, by a strip of permanently dry land which can be as narrow as 4 kilometers in some places. The bottom of the lake is mostly composed of gypsum and mud and is covered in salt in summer. The lake emits a garlic-like odor. Although the dry soil in and around the lake appears arable, it is nearly barren due to the high concentration of salt. For the same reason, the soil absorbs much condensation overnight that keeps it partly humid during much of the day.

== Climate ==
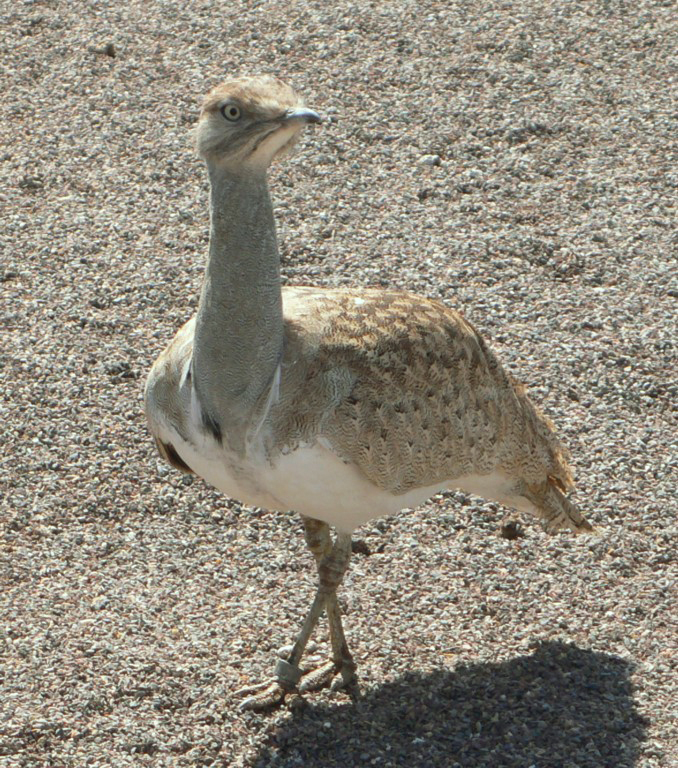
Houbara bustard

The climate in the Chott Melrhir is hot and arid with high evaporation and low precipitation. The average lowest and highest temperatures are 11.4 and 34.2 °C, respectively, and the minimum temperature is about 0 °C. Annual precipitation is below 160 mm. The winds have a speed between 2.7 and 5.3 m/s and are mostly directed south-east between June and September and north-west between autumn and early spring. Sandstorms are more frequent in winter and late summer and last 39 days per year on average.

== Flora and fauna ==
The shallow waters of the lake contain scarce vegetation composed of 72 species of plants which have adapted to salty water, such as sea lavender (Limonium), rushes (Juncus), glasswort (Salicornia), Sarcocornia, bulrush (Scirpus) and seepweeds (Suaeda). Some species are unique for Algeria and 14 are endemic, such as Fagonia microphylla, Oudneya africana, Zygophyllum cornutum, Limoniastrum feii and Ammosperma cinerea. They grown up to 30 cm in height and host relatively rich avifauna, mostly ducks, sandgrouse, houbara bustard (Chlamydotis undulata) and greater flamingo (Phoenicopterus roseus). Lake waters are saturated with salt with concentrations reaching 0.4 kg/L and sustain only few animal species, such as brine shrimp. Wild boars, golden jackals, hares and foxes were observed around the lake. In June 2003, Chott Melrhir was included to the List of Ramsar wetlands of international importance.
