= El Outaya District =

Coordinates: 35°02′53″N 5°34′12″E

- District
- Country: Algeria
- Province: Biskra Province
- Time zone: UTC+1 (CET)

El Outaya District is a district of Biskra Province, Algeria.

== Municipalities ==
The district has 1 municipality:

- El Outaya
