= El Kantara District =

Coordinates: 35.225218°N 5.706453°E

- District
- Country: Algeria
- Province: Biskra Province
- Time zone: UTC+1 (CET)

El Kantara District is a district of Biskra Province, Algeria. El Kantara "الكنترة" word comes from Latin "Centuriation" (Derja: meaning a bridge)

== Municipalities ==
The district has 2 municipalities:

- El Kantara
- Ain Zaatout
