= Ourlala =

- Commune and town

- Location within Algeria Location within Africa
- Coordinates: 34°39′20″N 5°30′41″E
- Country: Algeria
- Province: Biskra Province
- District: Ourlal District

Population (1998)
  - Total: 5,820
- Time zone: UTC+1 (CET)

Ourlala is a town and commune in Biskra Province, Algeria. According to the 1998 census it has a population of 5,820.
