= Biskra =

Capital city of Biskra Province, Algeria

Biskra Arabic: بسكرة Tamazight: ⴱⵉⵙⴽⵔⴰ
- City and commune
- City of Biskra
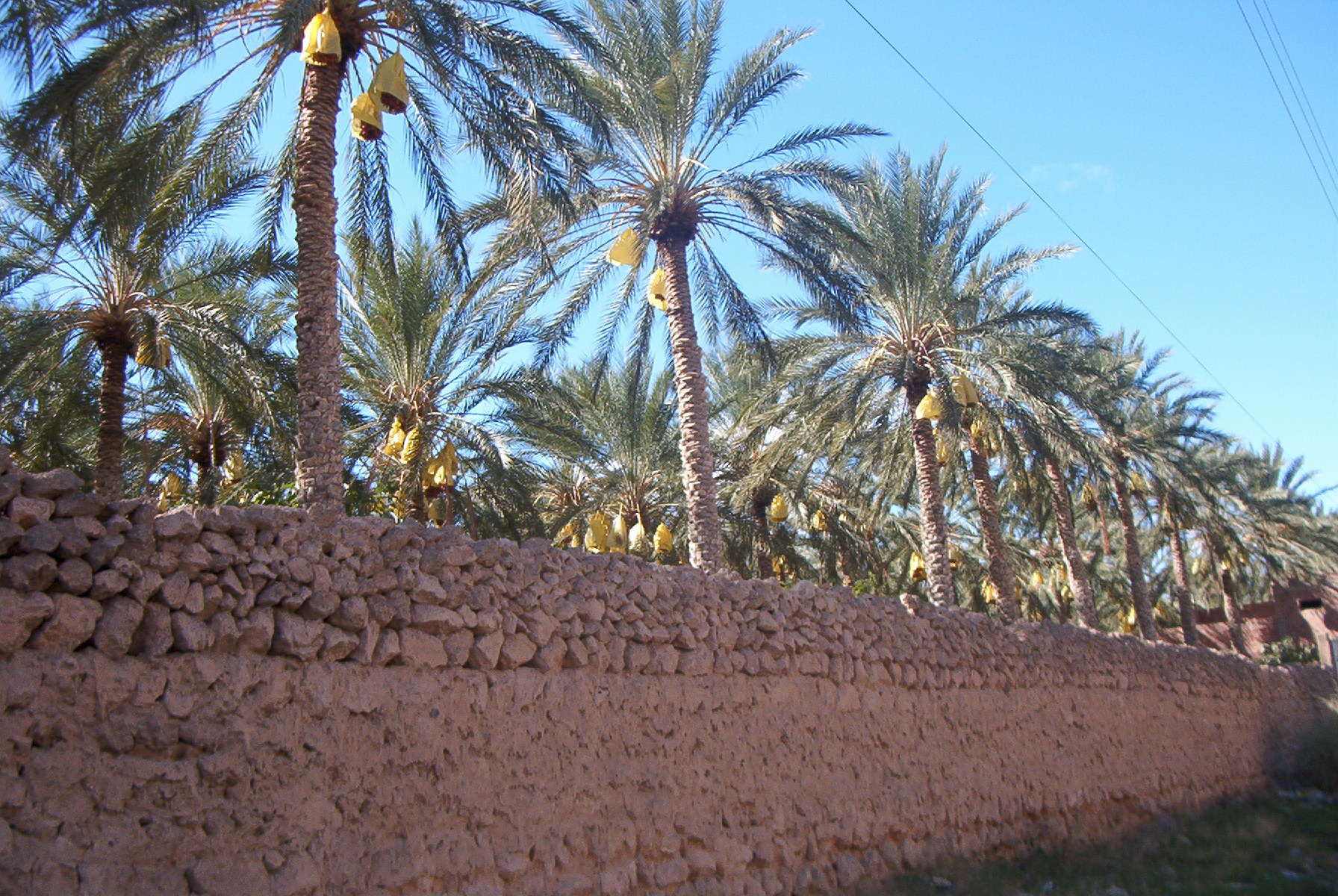
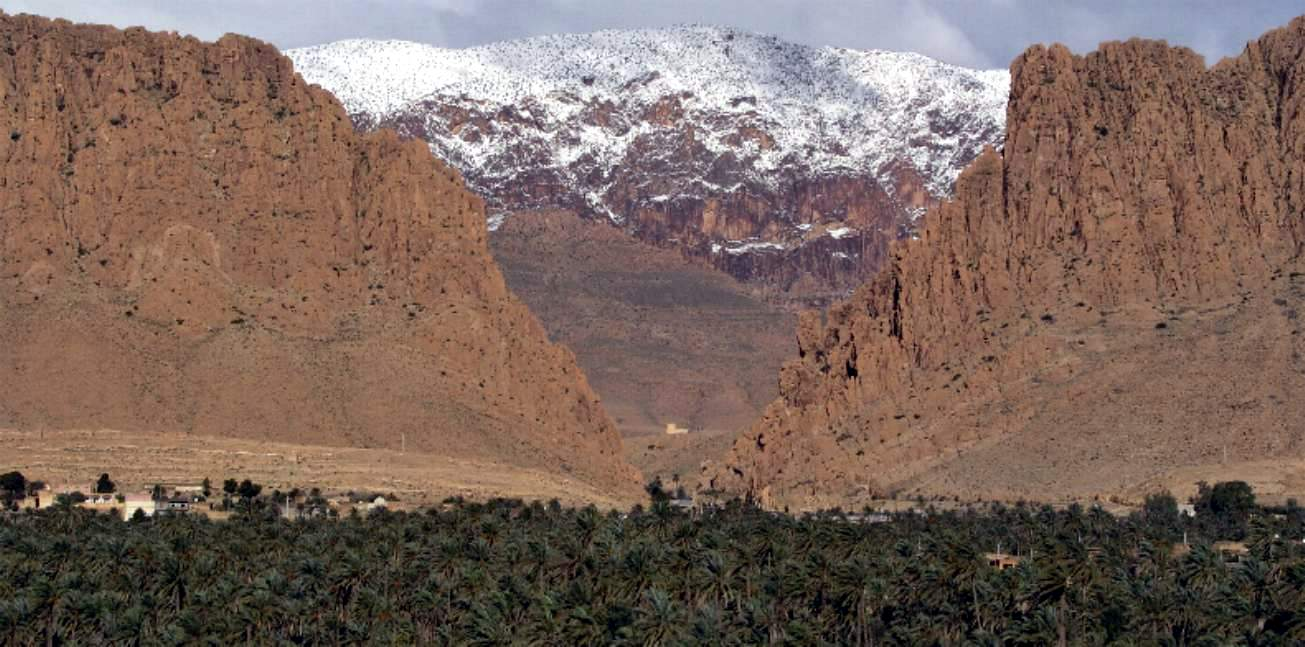
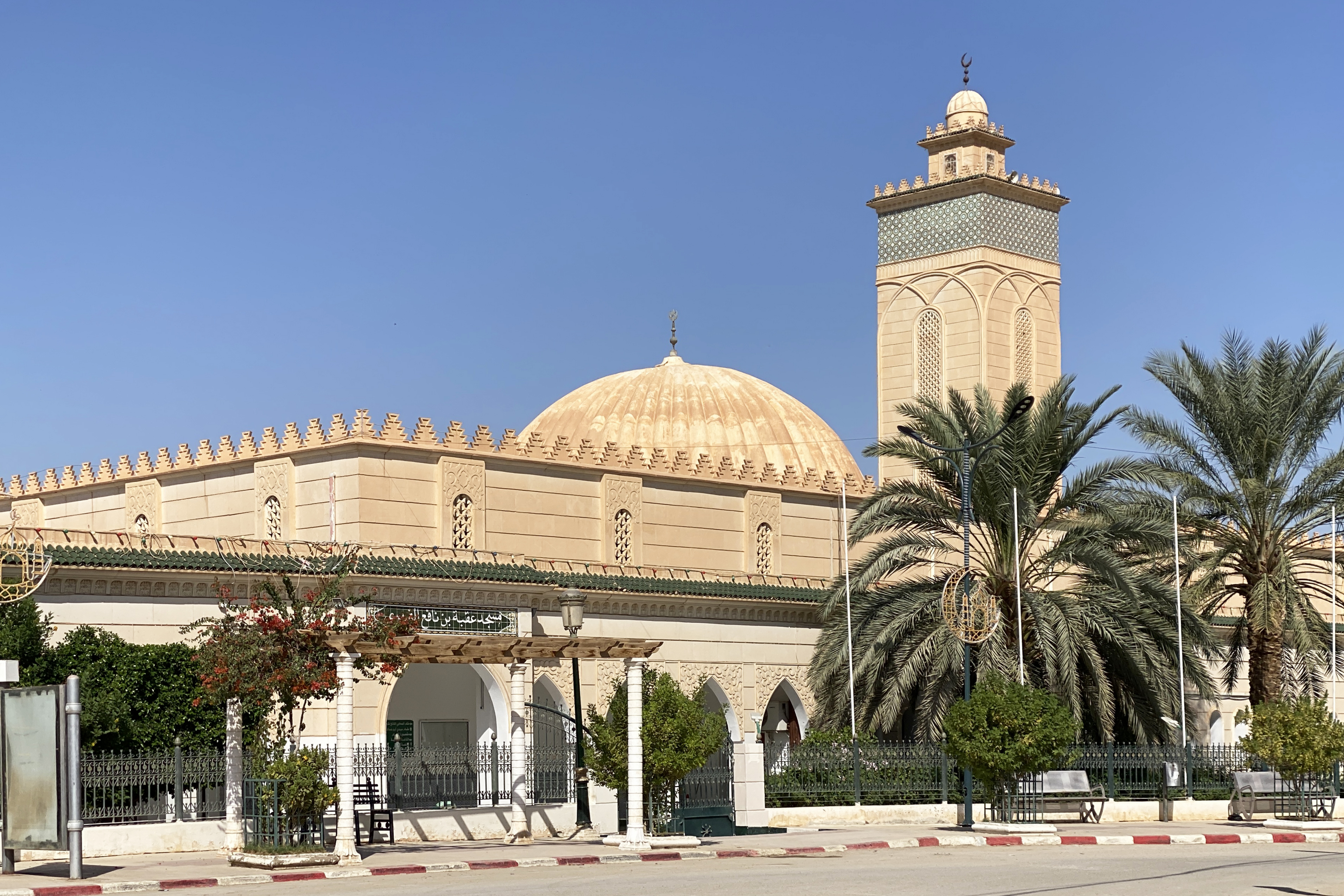
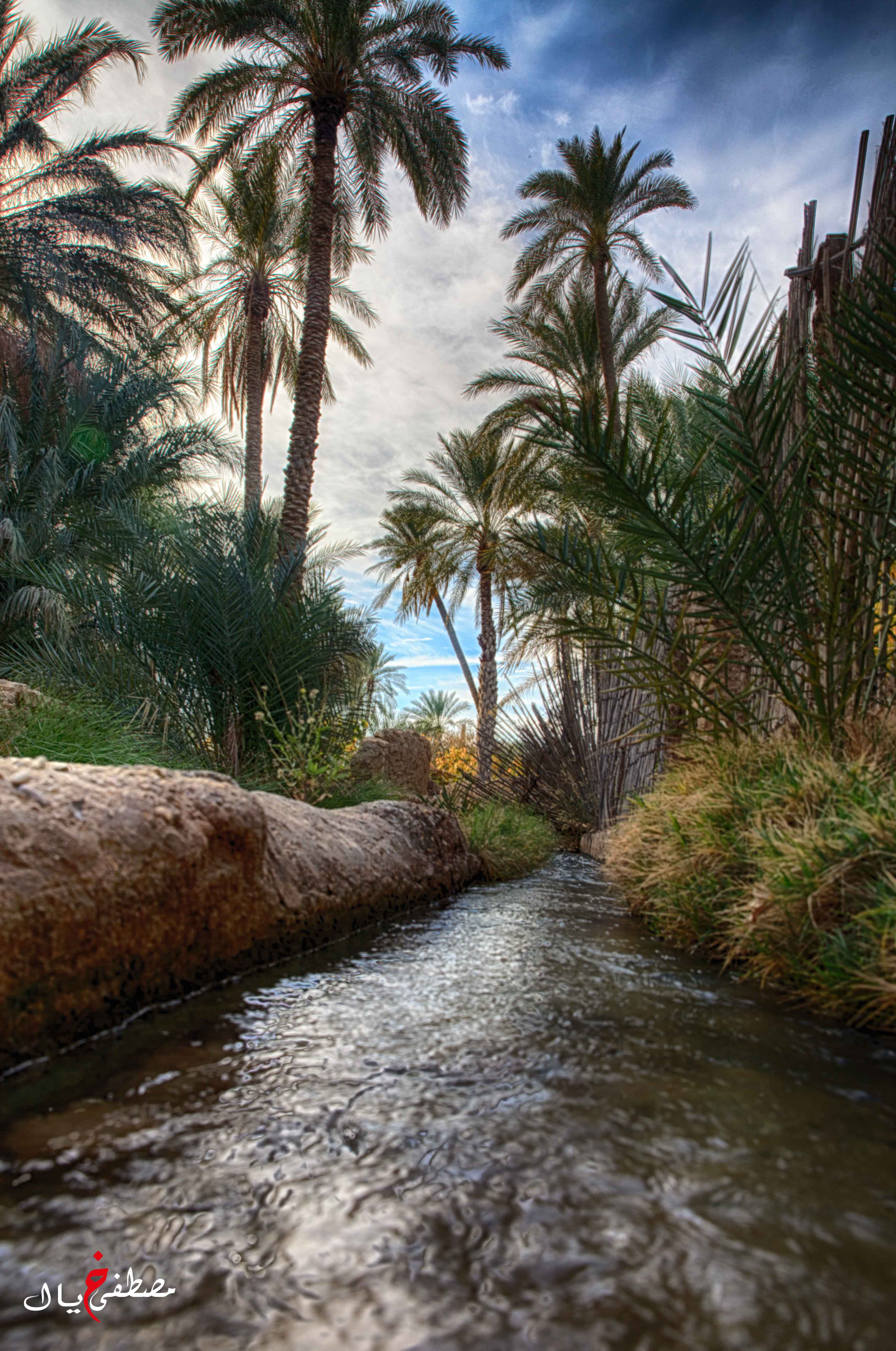
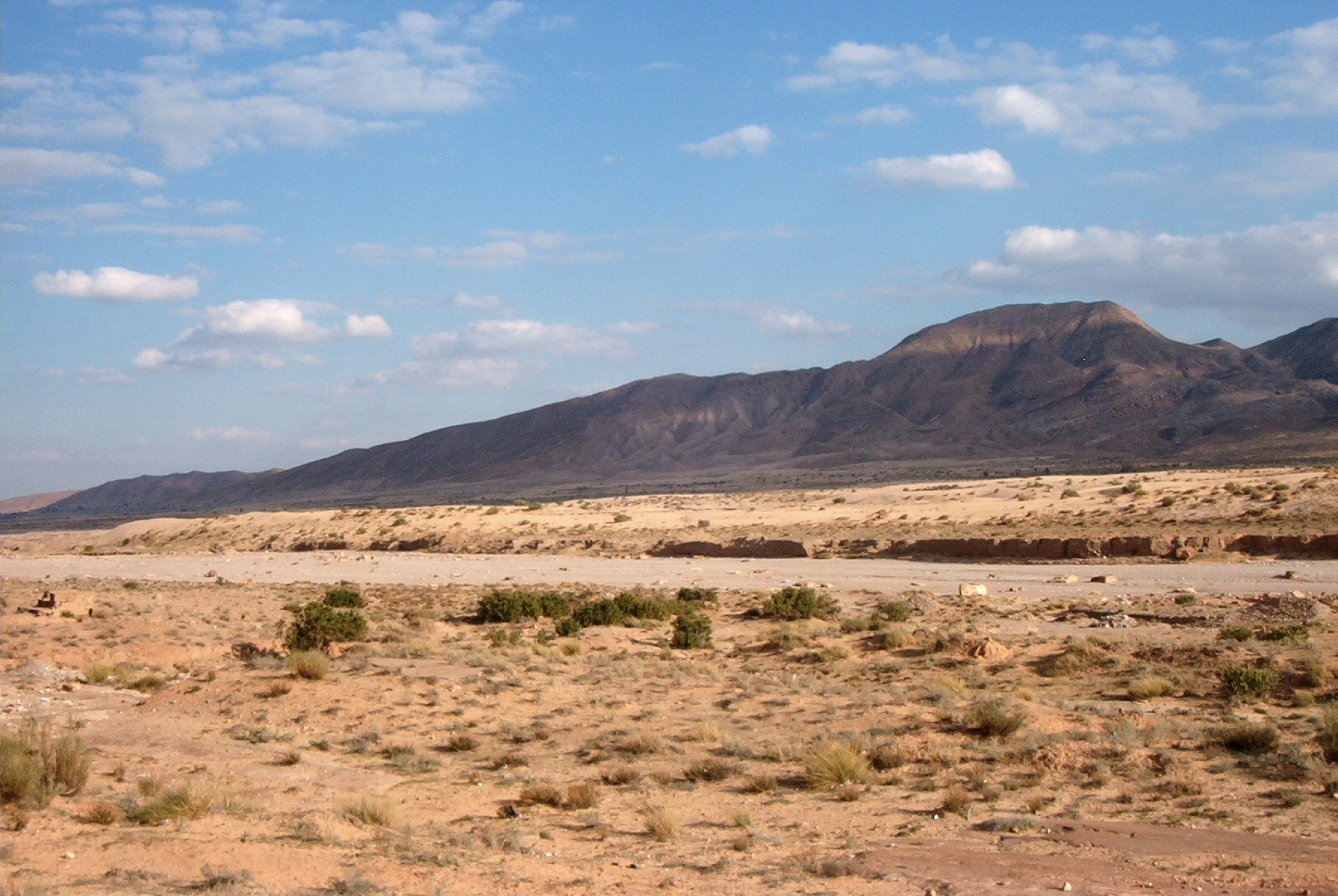
- Tolga Oasis El Kantara Gorge Sidi Okba Mosque Chetma Oasis Zibans Mountains
- Nickname: Queen of the Zibans
- Location of Biskra within Algeria
- Coordinates: 34°51′N 5°44′E
- Country: Algeria
- Province: Biskra Province
- District: Biskra District

Government
  - PMA Seats: 33

Area
  - City and commune: 127.55 km^{2} (49.25 sq mi)
- Elevation: 87 m (285 ft)

Population (2007)
  - City and commune: 204,661
  - Density: 1,604.6/km^{2} (4,155.8/sq mi)
  - Metro: 307,987
- Demonym: Biskri (male) Biskria (female)
- Time zone: UTC+01 (CET)
- Postal code: 07000
- Area code: (+213) 033
- Vehicle registration: 07
- ONS code: 0701
- Climate: BWh

Biskra (Arabic: بسكرة, romanized: Biskra, Tamazight: ⴱⵉⵙⴽⵔⴰ, romanized: Biksra) is the main city of Zibans region and administratively capital city of Biskra Province in Algeria. In 2007, its population was recorded as 307,987. Biskra is located in northeastern Algeria, about 248 miles (399 km) from Algiers, 71 miles (114 km) southwest of Batna and 137 miles (220 km) north of Touggourt. It is nicknamed "The Queen of the Zibans", "The Door of the Desert" or "The Saharan Nice" because of its location at the beginning of the Sahara Desert. Due to its geographical location, its climate and natural resources, particularly farming, Biskra has always been a crossroad between the cities in the north and south. It has seen the passage of several civilizations, from the Romans and the Arabs to the French.

In 1844, Biskra became a French garrison, which saw fighting during rebellions in 1849 and 1871.

Currently the city of Biskra has 28 neighborhoods, including the three principal neighborhoods of Korra, City 60 Logements, and Equipment Zones. It is in the southern part of the Algerian rail system, and has become a popular winter resort.

== Etymology ==
The city has been known by many names, including Biskra, Sokkra, Vescra, Vecera, Vescera, Adbesran. Historians do not agree on the origins of the current name. Some say its name comes from "Vescera", which means "station" or "place" of commercial exchange, due to its location connecting north and south. The Roman leader Betolimih Benyouba named it "the river of destiny" because of the Sidi Zarzour (its current name) that crosses the city.

Some researchers say that its name was derived from the ancient Roman name "Adebesran" because of the geothermal source that is located near the city, known as Salhine Hammam. Other sources say that the name comes from the word "Sokkra" because of the quality of the sweet dates in the city's oases. Still others claim that the current name was given to the city by the Carthaginians.

In honor of the city, the name was given to an oasis, Biskra Palms, near Palm Springs, California.

== History ==
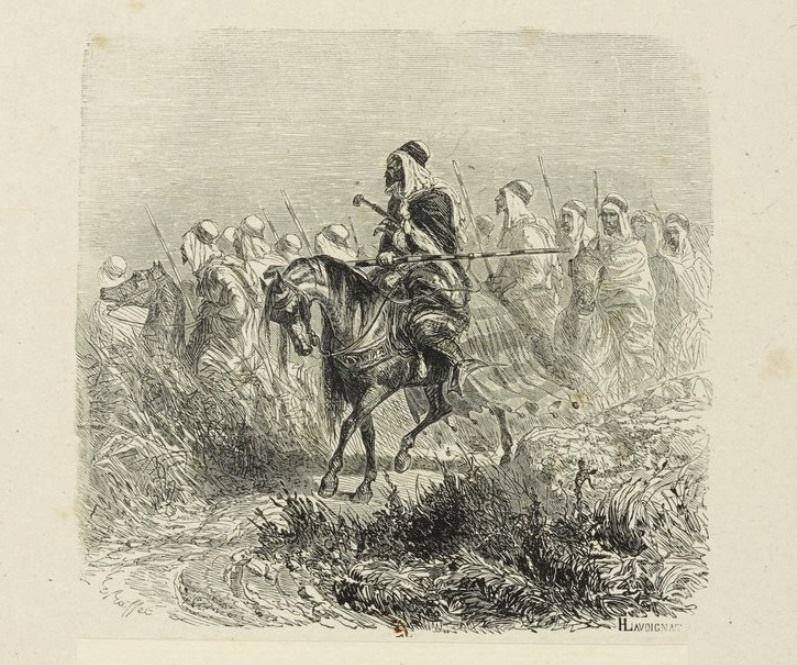

=== Gaetuli ===
The Gaetuli first appeared in North Africa during the 3rd millennium BC. They settled in a large territory south of the Roman provinces of Africa and Mauritania. According to the Greek historian Strabo, they were the most numerous people of North Africa yet the least known. Among the oldest references to the Gaetuli are those of the Carthaginians, who indicated that the Prince of the Gaetuli proposed to marry Élyssa (or Dido for the Romans), the founding queen of Carthage (present-day Tunisia) around 815 BC. However, references in ancient Egypt of certain tribes go back to 1350 BC, during the reign of Akhenaten of the eighteenth dynasty, speak of cattle trade with this people.

The Gaetuli are probably the origin of the Berber calendar, which begins around 943–949 BC, which would be after the victory of a coalition of Gétules over the Egyptians. This coalition, formed by the North African tribes, left southwestern Algeria, increasing its force as it passed through North Africa. The coalition led by Shoshenq (Berber name: Sheshnaq) defeated Pharaoh Psusennes II. Following this victory, Sheshnaq married the pharaoh's daughter, settled on the throne of Egypt under the name of Sheshonq in 952 BC, and founded the 22nd Dynasty. This biblical event is mentioned in the Old Testament, which speaks of the pillaging of this leader of the Machaouach tribe.

While traversing the desert, the Gaetuli arrived with the Taureg at Tassili, where they stayed for an extended time and subsequently mixed with the Tuareg and learned the Tamazight language for cultural and commercial exchanges. However, the Gaetuli eventually began to feel out of place and decided to continue north.

In Algeria, they settled at the edge of the Aures, where they posed problems to Roman infiltration in the 3rd century BC as they were stellar horsemen and became dreaded in combat. It was necessary to involve a late Roman politician, Gaius Marius, to negotiate exploration of the South against concessions of agricultural land around Cirta and Setifis, at the time under Roman rule; a trick of dispersing them and so diminished in their strength. Thus, the Gétule were occupied by the Romans.

=== Roman colonization ===
The city of Biskra experienced many violent wars during the Roman colonization, including the resistance war led by the Berber leader Tacfarinas, followed by his successor, the militant Jugurtha "Youghorta". With the help of the inhabitants of the city, who provided human and material support, Jugurtha destroyed the Roman army at the end of the so-called Numidia region.

=== The Vandals in the 4th century ===
The Vandals "Oundals" invaded the city of Biskra and occupied all its land, but the resistance and continuous fighting of its inhabitants forced the Vandals to integrate with them. After a few decades, the Romans took over the city, where they built obstacles to protect themselves from the vengeance of the population.

=== The arrival of the Arab conqueror Uqba ibn Nafi al-Fihri in the 7th century ===
They remained with such vigilance until the arrival of the Arab conqueror Uqba ibn Nafi al-Fihri in the 7th century AD. During this period, the whole area came under the Arab-Muslim monarchy. After 20 years of conquest, Uqba ibn Nafi died in 683 AD when he returned from Morocco with his army. His death was organized by an ambush mounted by his adversary, the Numidian prince (Berber) Koceila and his army at Tahouda, a small village located 5 km from the oasis "Sidi Okba". His body was buried in the mosque of the city that took his name. According to the imam of this mosque, it contains more than 300 tombs and is the 4th holy place of Islam, after Mecca, Medina and Aksa.

In the early 10th century, Biskra and the entire Ziban area were conquered by the kings of Beni Hammad.

=== The Hillal Bannis in the 12th century ===
Followed by the Kabyla of Elathbend banished Hilal (Hilalian Arabs) who removed and confiscated the property of the inhabitants. They asked for the help of the Almohads of the kingdom of Marrakech in the 12th century.

In the book Al Istibsar fi 'agaib al-Amsar, written in the late 12th century, the author describes the city as:

"A large city, surrounded by many fortresses and thriving villages, and it serves as their capital. It has a vast forest abundant with palm trees, olive trees, and various fruits. Biskra is particularly known for its numerous palm trees. [..] A large river flows through the forest of Biskra, descending from the Aurès Mountains, irrigating its orchards and palm groves. It stretches for about six miles through a continuous forest connected to the city, running through its villages. Biskra is also a center of jurisprudence and knowledge, home to scholars. Among its villages is a place called Malsoun."

=== The Hafsids in the 14th century ===
In the 14th century, the Hafsid arrived in Tunisia and Algeria. Biskra became an important hub for the Hafsid of Tunisia where it remained under lure monarchy and direction for a long time then under the authority of the Marinid Sultanate of Fez and banned Abd-Elouadi and the Znatiyin of Tlemcen.

=== The conquest of the city by the Turks in 1541 ===
In 1541, the Turks began their conquest of the city under the direction of Hocine Agha who defended the city of Algiers at the time and brought out the strength of Charles Compte of the latter.

The Ottoman Empire remained in the city for three centuries until the French colonized it.

=== French colonization from 1844 ===
After the French conquest of Biskra in 1844, the site was fortified to secure the area against uprisings. El-hadj Mohammed Esaghire Elokbi, as the successor to El-Emir Abdelkader, waged continued war against the French, attacking the French forces under Lamoriciere on 23 December 1847. Elokbi also opposed the Ben Ghana clan as well as Ahmed Bey's claim as ruler of Constantine. Resistance continued in the Ziban and Aurès Moufrntains.

In Biskra the local chief Bou Zian rallied the people against the palm tax, seizing the moated fortification of Zaatcha 20 km from Biskra. The French marched on Zaatcha, laying siege for months. It finally fell after 53 days of attacks by a French force of 7,000 troops. Bou Zian was killed. The French counted the loss of 2130. French control nonetheless remained tenuous when attacks were mounted again in 1879 at El-kamri.

Some 100 years after the battle of Zaatcha, in 1954 Biskra was again the scene of anti-French assaults during the Algerian War of Independence where house-to-house battles cost many lives.

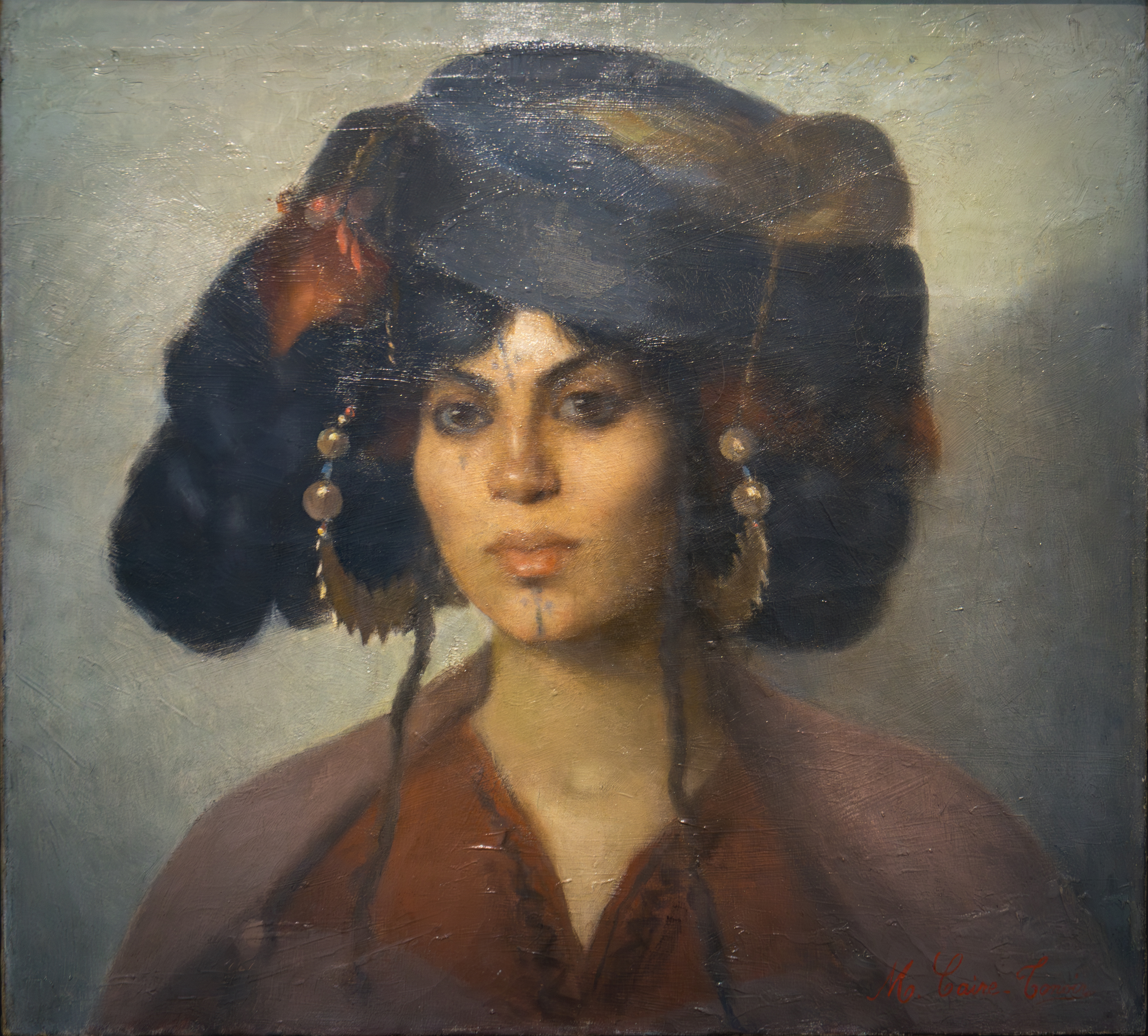
Portrait of a woman by Marie Tonoir (1899)

=== In culture ===
At the end of the 19th century Biskra, a popular spa town and gateway to the Sahara, became a center for artists and photographers such as Émile Frechon, Alexandre Bougault and Rudolf Franz Lehnert. From 1872 to 1920 the French Count Albert Landon de Longueville hosted in his villa-cum-chateau at Biskra (today Villa Bénévent), nobility, artists and writers, including Béla Bartok, Oscar Wilde, Scott and Zelda Fitzgerald, André Gide, Nasreddine Dinet, Eugène Fromentin, Karl Marx, Anatole France, Francis James and Henri Matisse.

Biskra is the setting of key sections of André Gide's 1902 novel The Immoralist and lesser known 1897 prose-poem Les nourritures terrestres (The Fruits of the Earth), and he visited the town in 1895 (for a fortnight from 31 January) with Lord Alfred Douglas, following a meeting with Oscar Wilde in Blida and Algiers.

The French artist Henri Matisse has a work titled Blue Nude (Souvenir de Biskra) an oil painting finished in 1907.

The Hungarian composer Béla Bartók collected traditional music in Biskra in 1913.

The Polish composer Karol Szymanowski, who traveled to North Africa, seemed to have been quite impressed by Biskra. This trip probably aroused genuine interest in the North African/ Arabic culture. He composed many pieces influenced by his experience there. He sent a postcard from Biskra on 11 April 1914.

Diana Mayo, the protagonist of Edith Maude Hull's popular 1919 novel The Sheik, starts her journey into the desert from Biskra, and in the identically named 1921 silent movie The Sheik starring Rudolph Valentino in perhaps his most famous role.

Winston Churchill's cousin, sculptor and author Clare Sheridan held a salon in Biskra in the 1920s and 1930s.

== Geography ==
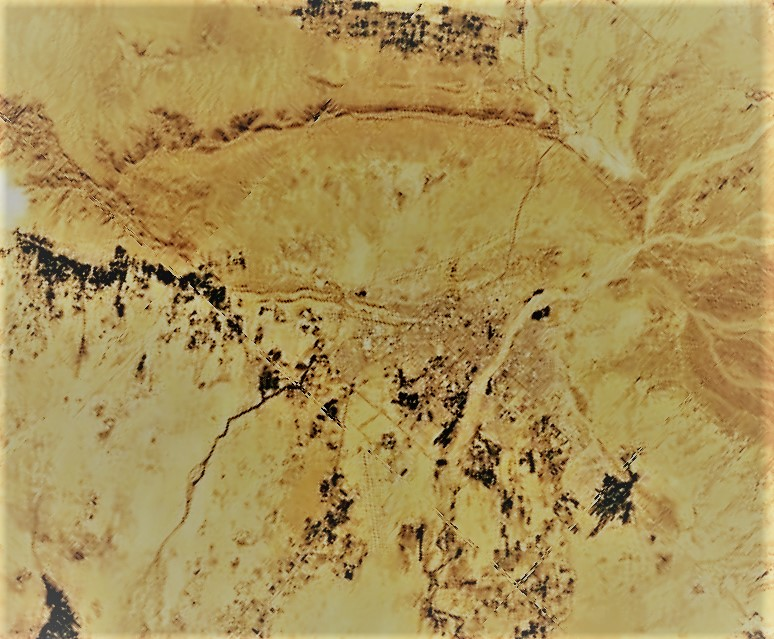
Satellite image of Biskra City

Biskra is located in the north-east of Algeria, in the district of Biskra. The city lies about 248 miles (399 km) from Algiers, 71 miles (114 km) southwest of Batna and 137 miles (220 km) north of Touggourt. She is nicknamed "The Queen of the Zibans", "The door of the desert" or "The Saharan Nice" because of its location which is the beginning of the desert. It is located at an altitude of 87 m (285 ft) in the northern part of the Sahara Desert.

Apart from the mountains that surround it, the topography of Biskra is generally very flat. Part of the city is surrounded by the Sfa Pass and the Ziban Mountains. In the outskirts of Biskra, the landscape is very arid with all the same vegetation that vary depending on the location. Small water points can be found in the outskirts of Biskra, especially in the oases and canyons of the mountains around El Kantara. The prefecture of Biskra is crossed by Oued Labiod waterways, Oued El Arab, Djedi, Oued Meziraâ, Oued El and Oued el Gantara. The city covers an area of 127.55 km^{2} (49.25 sq mi). It has a population of 307,987 and is the 10th most populous city. It has a population density of 1,612.0 inhabitants per square meter. The population of Biskra are called Biskri.

As in the rest of the country, Biskra does not observe summer time and stays in the same time zone all year round. Whether winter or summer, the time is always the same in Biskra. The sunrise is around 7:41 am to 21 December and 5:24 am on 21 June. The sunset is around 5:30 pm on 21 December and at 7:54 pm on 21 June.

=== Cityscape ===
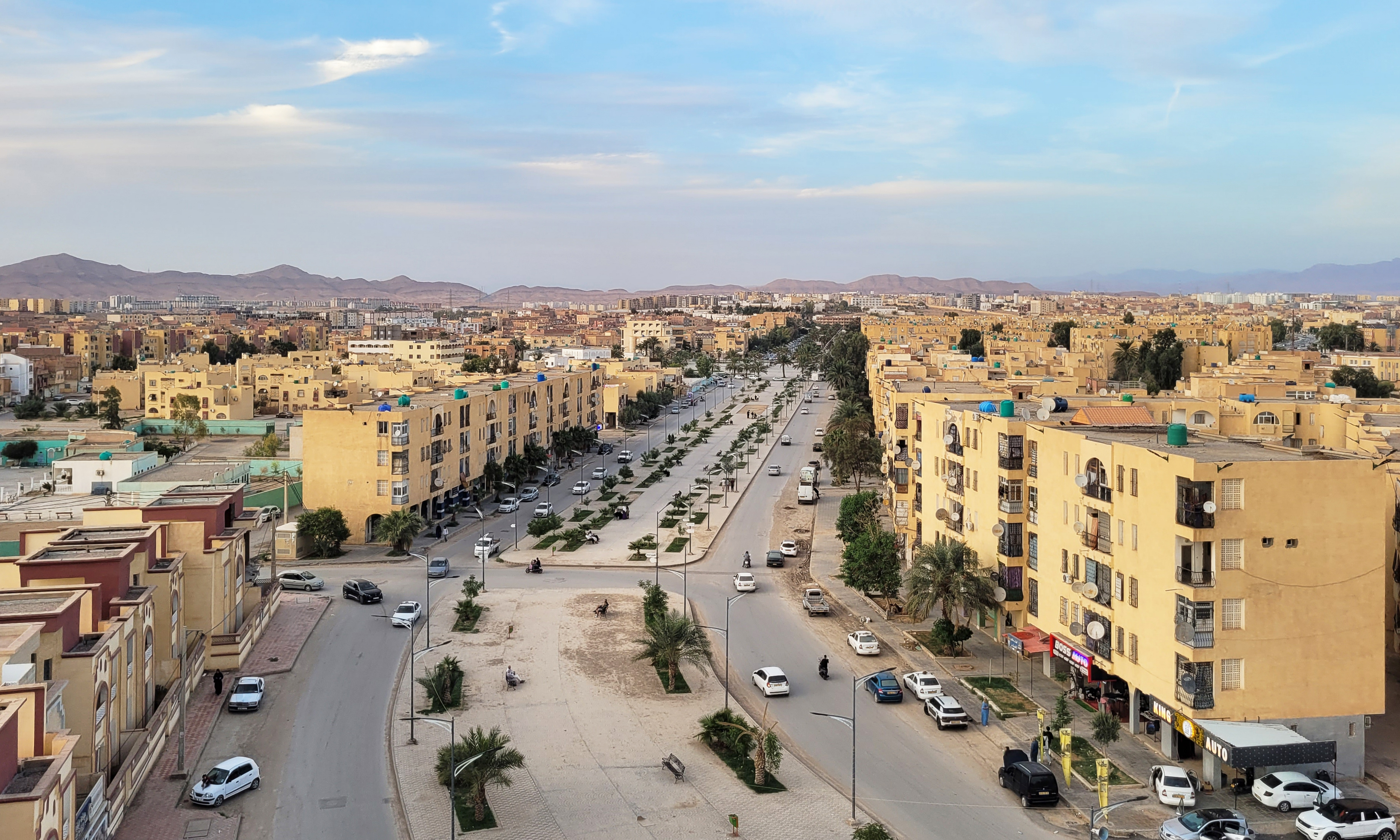
Biskra Cityscape.

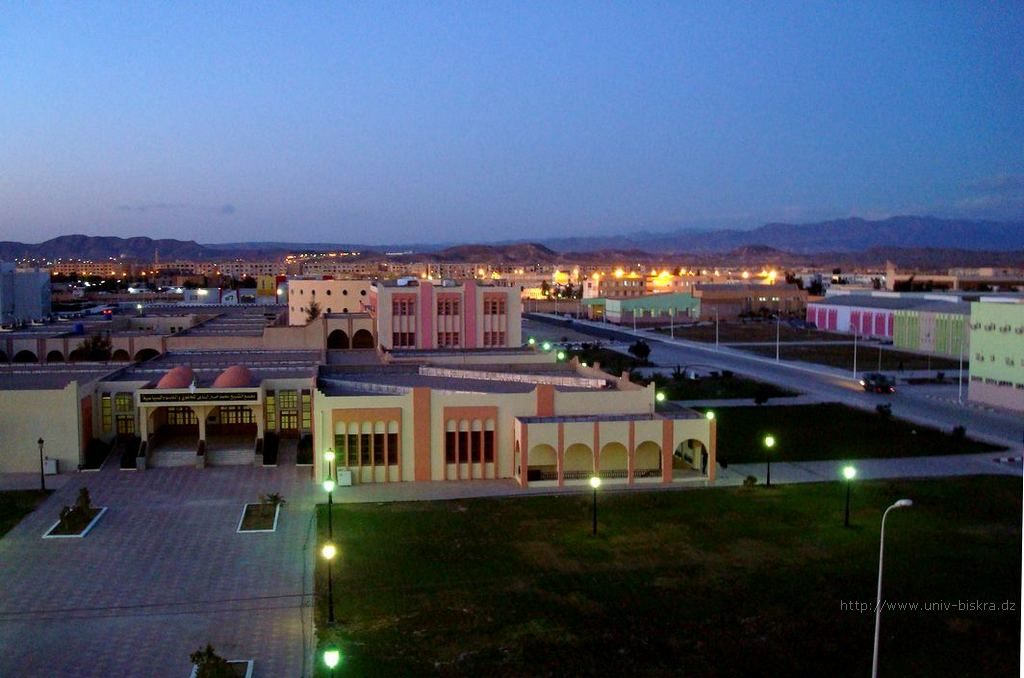
Biskra University.

=== Neighborhoods ===
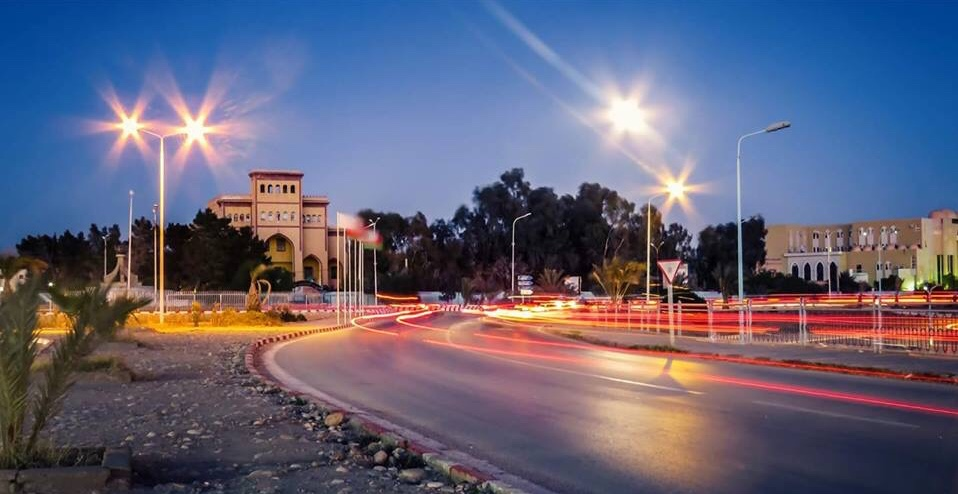
Street of Biskra at night

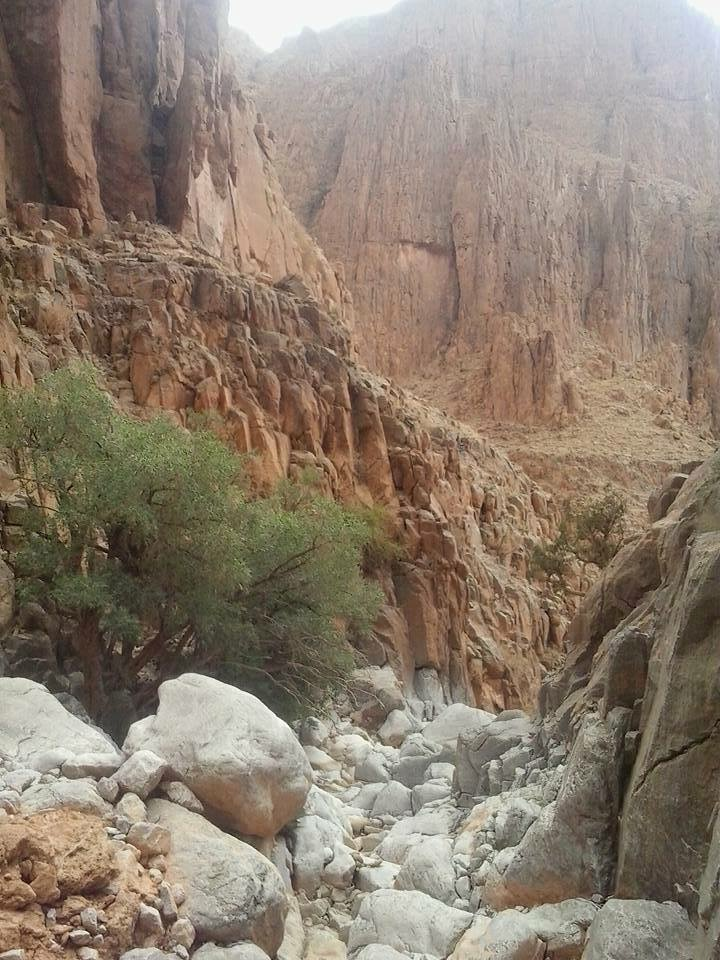
A Giant Canyon at proximity of Biskra

The city of Biskra has gone through three phases before getting to where it is today. Started by the pre-colonial phase which testifies, that the city was pending this period under Roman rule over country of the Berbers, and having taken the role of the capital of southern Numidia, and the

A very prosperous city, built by the Muslims in the Middle Ages. During the Turkish period the city was hit by epidemics, binding occupiers of the fort to leave the city to settle, in a group scattered the interior of the palm grove, south of the city, around two elements of the form local production, the built environment that are the mosque and seguias, besides the use local building materials.

Secondly, the city was marked by the colonial phase characterized by the building of fort Saint Germain on the northern part, and the construction of a city (the colonial checkerboard) by an urban model, different from the previous one, and having undergone several extension, particularly the 1st and 2nd and the Dervau Plan, followed during the 50s, by popular extensions to the South at the expense of the palm grove and without dimensional and formal logic.

In the end the post colonial phase characterized by the proliferation of self-built no plan to urban and architectural quality at least and without model, where typological reference, which has only to be curbed, after the instruction of the laws intervention and control of the state, over the urban space, by launching large Housing development operations in the framework of ZUNH, in the form of housing communal collective or subdivision which, despite this, has not been able to resolve the demand for housing, bringing the state to promulgation, other laws havingobjective, improving urban quality, openness and diversification stakeholders.

Today, the city of Biskra is made up of 28 neighborhoods including 3 main ones which are, Korra, City 60 Logts ENICAB and Equipment Zones.

=== Climate ===
Biskra has a subtropical hot desert climate (Köppen climate classification BWh) typical of the region in which it is found. The city has long and extremely hot summers and short, pleasantly warm winters. In summer, the peaks of heat are among the highest in the country with temperatures that can exceed 49 °C (120 °F) and are similar to cities like Luxor or Phoenix. The average peak July temperature, which is the hottest month, is about 42 °C (108 °F). On average, the city experiences more than 92 days a year where the temperature is equal to or exceeds 38 °C (100 °F) and nearly 20 days above 43 °C (109 °F). In comparison, New York City has had a total of 59 days when the temperature was equivalent to or above 38 °C (100 °F) since 1870. Temperatures generally begin to approach or even exceed 34 °C (93 °F) by April. Biskra is one of the hottest cities in the country when it comes to daytime temperatures. Indeed, this one is often higher than 27 °C (81 °F) during the hottest months. The highest minimum temperature recorded in Biskra was 37 °C (99 °F) on 4 July 1993, making it the hottest night ever recorded in the city. On 14 July 1910, the temperature reached 51 °C (124 °F) which is the record of heat in Biskra.

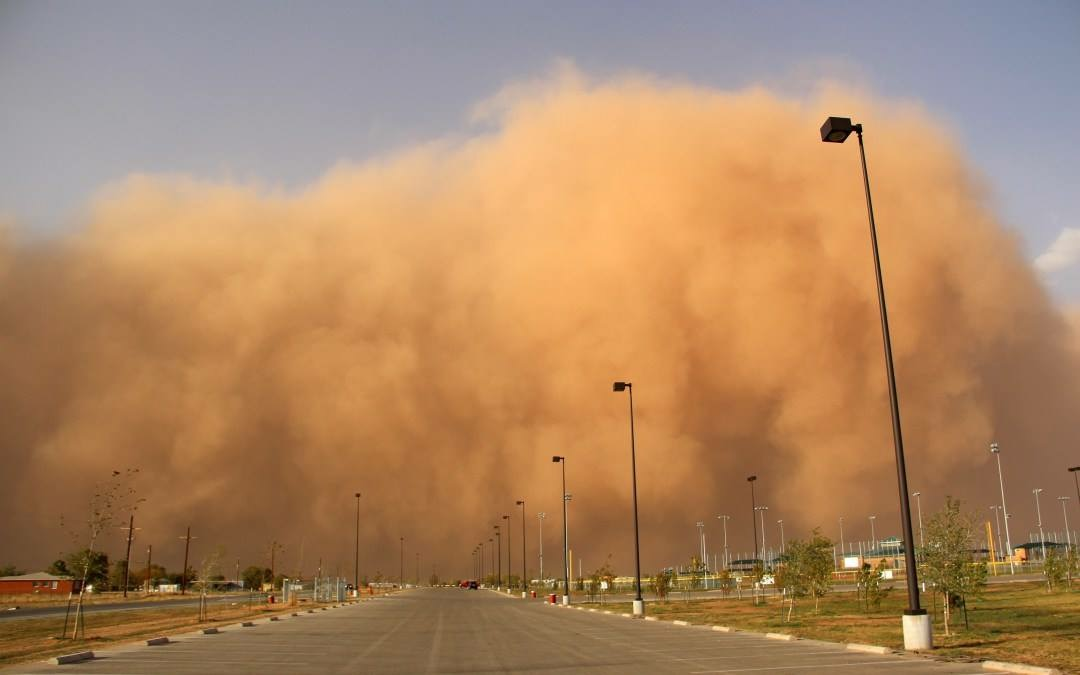
A 2018 Haboob

The climate is very dry and mostly very clear. Rainfall is limited to only 128.8 mm per year. Precipitation is quite rare despite some showers usually during the coldest months, mainly January and February, where it rains several times in the season, which brings the majority of humidity to Biskra in a year. The highest precipitation record recorded in Biskra in a year is (600.5 mm) in 1910 while the driest year is only (27.7 mm) recorded in 1945. The extreme heat that prevails during the summer can cause violent storms at the end of it and usually occur in September, when the air humidity becomes significantly higher with an average of 41% moisture per year. The month with the highest air rate in Biskra is December with 59% humidity, July is the least heavy month with only 27% on average per year. Aside from rainfall or humidity, sandstorms can occur several times a month and even become Haboob, which can make visibility almost zero. Biskra has a very good duration of sunshine in the year with an average of 3,292 hours of sunshine a year. The wettest month is November with (20.1 mm), while July is the driest month with (1.7 mm).

The hot, dry and sunny climate of the city sometimes attracts some inhabitants of the northern regions as in the city of Batna located 115 km northeast, which experiences fairly icy and wet winters during this period, to enjoy the pleasant weather and sunny in winter.

On average, Biskra knows no day in the year with a temperature below zero. Moving away from the urban area, the risk of frost may be more frequent and night temperatures are lower. Biskra very rarely experiences freezing days and only occurs occasionally during periods of mild cold weather. what can happen to Biskra and its surroundings. The record for the largest number of frost days recorded at Biskra in a winter is 1980–1981 with 73 days, while the record for the number of consecutive years experiencing freeze-up in Biskra is 1886 years. 1888. The lowest recorded temperature in Biskra was −5 °C (23 °F) on 27 December 1914, while the lowest daily maximum temperature was 7 °C (45 °F) on 2 February 1934.

Climate data for Biskra (Biskra Airport) (1991–2020, extremes 1878–present)
Month	Jan	Feb	Mar	Apr	May	Jun	Jul	Aug	Sep	Oct	Nov	Dec	Year
Record high °C (°F)	29.0 (84.2)	31.0 (87.8)	34.8 (94.6)	42.0 (107.6)	45.3 (113.5)	48.0 (118.4)	51.0 (123.8)	49.0 (120.2)	46.0 (114.8)	40.5 (104.9)	35.3 (95.5)	27.5 (81.5)	51.0 (123.8)
Mean daily maximum °C (°F)	17.3 (63.1)	19.2 (66.6)	23.2 (73.8)	27.1 (80.8)	32.5 (90.5)	37.7 (99.9)	41.1 (106.0)	40.3 (104.5)	34.7 (94.5)	29.2 (84.6)	22.2 (72.0)	18.0 (64.4)	28.5 (83.4)
Daily mean °C (°F)	12.1 (53.8)	13.6 (56.5)	17.3 (63.1)	21.1 (70.0)	26.2 (79.2)	31.2 (88.2)	34.5 (94.1)	34.0 (93.2)	29.1 (84.4)	23.7 (74.7)	17.1 (62.8)	13.0 (55.4)	22.7 (72.9)
Mean daily minimum °C (°F)	6.9 (44.4)	8.0 (46.4)	11.4 (52.5)	15.1 (59.2)	19.9 (67.8)	24.7 (76.5)	28.0 (82.4)	27.7 (81.9)	23.4 (74.1)	18.1 (64.6)	12.0 (53.6)	8.0 (46.4)	16.9 (62.4)
Record low °C (°F)	−3.0 (26.6)	−0.5 (31.1)	1.3 (34.3)	3.0 (37.4)	5.0 (41.0)	12.0 (53.6)	16.1 (61.0)	15.0 (59.0)	11.0 (51.8)	4.2 (39.6)	1.0 (33.8)	−5.0 (23.0)	−5.0 (23.0)
Average precipitation mm (inches)	16.0 (0.63)	8.4 (0.33)	14.7 (0.58)	16.6 (0.65)	11.1 (0.44)	3.4 (0.13)	0.7 (0.03)	2.7 (0.11)	16.2 (0.64)	15.3 (0.60)	14.8 (0.58)	9.2 (0.36)	129.1 (5.08)
Average precipitation days (≥ 1.0 mm)	2.2	1.6	2.1	2.0	1.6	0.6	0.2	0.7	2.9	2.0	1.6	2.0	19.5
Average relative humidity (%)	57	50	44	39	34	31	27	31	41	48	55	59	43
Mean monthly sunshine hours	223.2	223.2	260.4	282.0	319.3	333.0	362.7	328.6	270.0	266.6	213.0	210.8	3,292.8
Mean daily sunshine hours	7.2	7.9	8.4	9.4	10.3	11.1	11.7	10.6	9.0	8.6	7.1	6.8	9.0
Source 1: NOAA
Source 2: Arab Meteorology Book (humidity and sun), Meteo Climat (record highs and lows)

=== Flora and Fauna ===
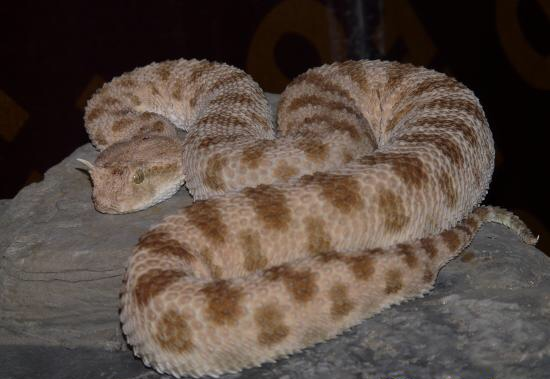
The Horned Viper

The fauna of Biskra is characterized by a great diversity of insects such as Sacred Scarab and yellow broad-tailed scorpions are found. There are also amphibians like frog, reptiles like the Horned Viper or the Egyptian cobra. A variety of birds including Black Warbler, mammals such as Gazelles, small Gerboise, Fox, Wild boar, Hare, Hedgehog, Bat, Myriapods, Crustaceans such as the Crab stream or the Water Flea. There are also a lot of black and red spiders that some species hide in dead tree stumps.

== Demographics ==
=== Population ===
Historical population
Year	Population
1901	7,500
1911	20,000
1926	22,000
1931	18,900
1936	21,300
1948	36,400
1954	52,500
1966	59,300
1977	77,000 (town); 90,500 (municipality)
1987	128,300
1998	177,600
2010	300,000
