= El Haouch =

Coordinates: 34°33′43″N 6°03′05″E

- Commune and town
- Interactive map of El Haouch
- Country: Algeria
- Province: Biskra Province

Population (1998)
  - Total: 4,328
- Time zone: UTC+1 (CET)

El Haouch is a town and commune in Biskra Province, Algeria. According to the 2008 census it has a population of 4,923.
