= Lichana =

Coordinates: 34°43′29″N 5°25′57″E

- Commune and town
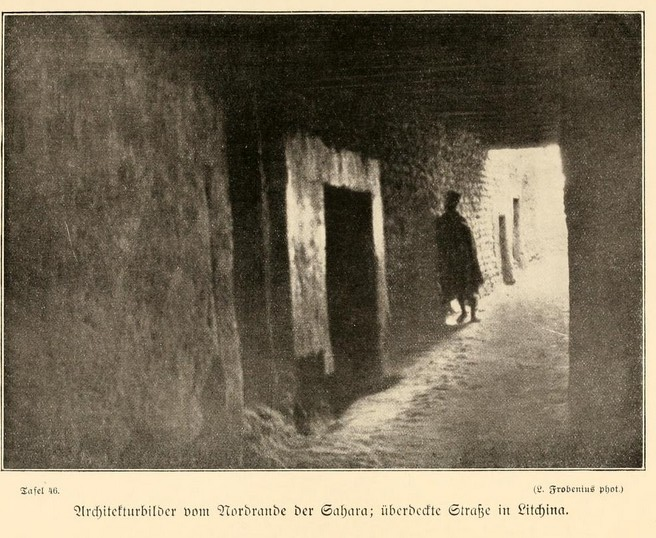
- Lichana in 1911
- Interactive map of Lichana
- Country: Algeria
- Province: Biskra Province

Population (1998)
  - Total: 8,740
- Time zone: UTC+1 (CET)

Lichana is a town and commune in Biskra Province, Algeria. According to the 1998 census it has a population of 8,740.

Lichana is located in south-east Algeria, 360 km south of the capital Algiers, part of the Tolga Oasis, an area known internationally for high-quality dates (Deglet Nour) with more than 500,000 date palm trees in the area.
