= Foughala =

Coordinates: 34°43′N 5°19′E

Foughala sidi bouzid
- Commune and town
- Interactive map of Foughala
- Country: Algeria
- Province: Biskra Province

Population (1998)
  - Total: 25,645
- Time zone: UTC+1 (CET)

Foughala is a town and commune in Biskra Province, Algeria. According to the 1998 census, it had a population of 9,713.
