= El Ghrous =

Coordinates: 34°42′19″N 5°17′07″E

- Commune and town
- Interactive map of El Ghrous
- Country: Algeria
- Province: Biskra Province

Population (1998)
  - Total: 12,846
- Time zone: UTC+1 (CET)

El Ghrous is a town and commune in Biskra Province, Algeria. According to the 2008 census it has a population of 16,408.
