= Bordj Ben Azzouz =

Coordinates: 34°41′50″N 5°21′46″E

- Commune and town
- Interactive map of Bordj Ben Azzouz
- Country: Algeria
- Province: Biskra Province

Population (1998)
  - Total: 11,043
- Time zone: UTC+1 (CET)

Bordj Ben Azzouz is a town and commune in Biskra Province, Algeria. According to the 1998 census it has a population of 11,043.
