= M'Lili =

- Commune and town
- Location within Algeria
- Coordinates: 34°48′21″N 6°42′25″E
- Country: Algeria
- Province: Biskra Province

Population (1998)
  - Total: 5,151
- Time zone: UTC+1 (CET)

M'Lili is a town and commune in Biskra Province, Algeria. According to the 1998 census it has a population of 5,151. During Roman times a large military settlement near the town was called Gemellae, though this may merely have been the Latin transliteration of the native name. It was seized by the Romans (see under Gemellae), and became a strategic settlement of the Limes Zabensis, the southern border of the province Numidia. Its name did not or only slightly (Gemellae) change under Roman rule.
