= Ain Zaatout =

Aïn Zaatout
- Commune and town
- Interactive map of Aïn Zaatout
- Country: Algeria
- Province: Biskra Province
- District: El Kantara District

Population (1998)
  - Total: 2,230
- Time zone: UTC+1 (CET)

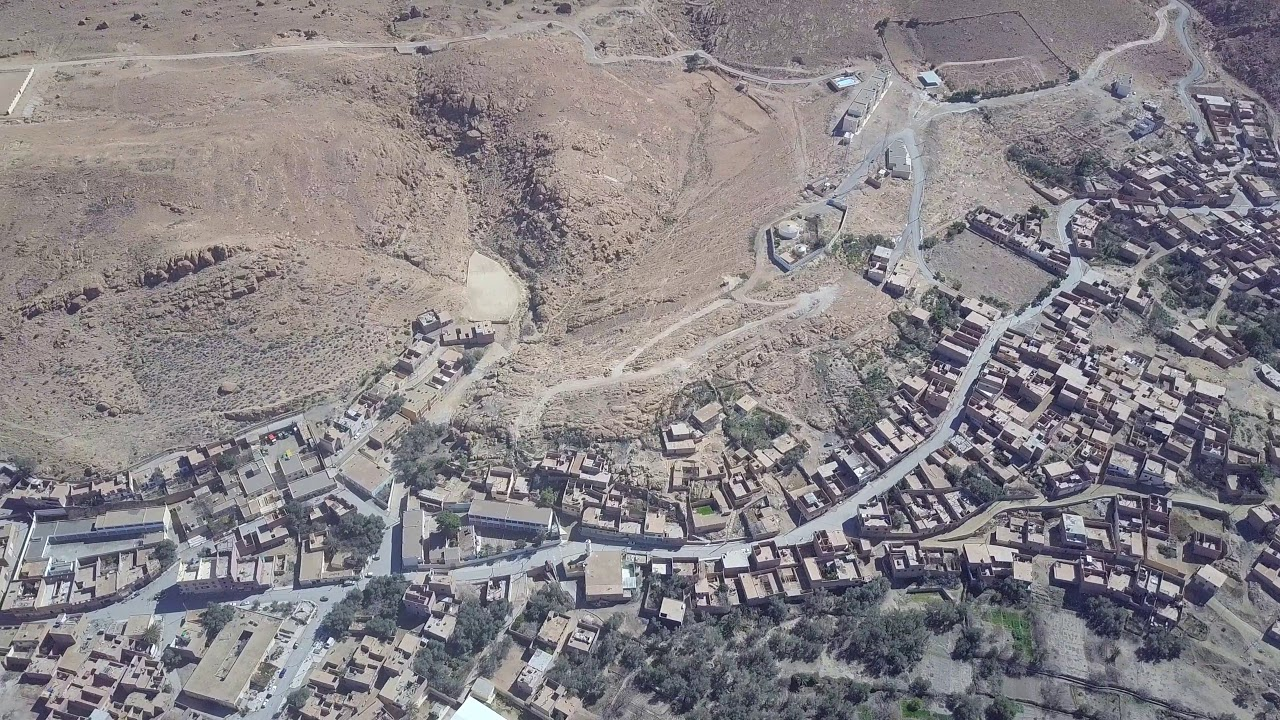
Sky view of ain zaatout

Ain Zaatout (Arabic: عين زعطوط) is the administrative name of a mountainous village in north east Algeria, called Ah Frah in the local Shawi dialect, and Beni Farah (sometimes spelled Beni Ferah) (Arabic: بني فرح) in Arabic.

It is located at 35.14° North, 5.83° East, at the southern edge of the Saharan Atlas between the provinces of Batna and Biskra. The region is largely rocky with an average altitude of more than 900 metres (2,953 feet) above sea level.

Aïn Zaatout has an estimated population of around 5,000 composed of Farhi people, Muslim Berbers speaking a distinctive variant of the Shawi dialect used in the Aurès.
