= Khenguet Sidi Nadjil =

Coordinates: 34.8058°N 6.7070°E

Khenguet Sidi Nadji
- Commune and town
- Interactive map of Khenguet Sidi Nadji
- Country: Algeria
- Province: Biskra Province

Population (1998)
  - Total: 2,526
- Time zone: UTC+1 (CET)

Khenguet Sidi Nadji is a town and commune in Biskra Province, Algeria. According to the 1998 census it has a population of 2,526.
