= Meziraa =

Coordinates: 34.7216°N 6.2928°E

- Commune and town
- Interactive map of Meziraa
- Country: Algeria
- Province: Biskra Province
- Time zone: UTC+1 (CET)

Meziraa or El Mizaraa is a town and commune in Biskra Province, Algeria.
