= El Feidh =

Coordinates: 34°31′17″N 6°31′20″E

- Commune and town
- Interactive map of El Feidh
- Country: Algeria
- Province: Biskra Province

Population (1998)
  - Total: 12,482
- Time zone: UTC+1 (CET)

El Feidh is a town and commune in Biskra Province, Algeria. According to the 1998 census it has a population of 12,482.
