= Mekhadma =

Coordinates: 34°39′N 5°29′E

- Commune and town
- Interactive map of Mekhadma
- Country: Algeria
- Province: Biskra Province

Population (1998)
  - Total: 4,317
- Time zone: UTC+1 (CET)

Mekhadma is a town and commune in Biskra Province, Algeria. According to the 1998 census it has a population of 4,317.
