= Bouchagroune =

Coordinates: 34°43′18″N 5°27′56″E

- Commune and town
- Country: Algeria
- Province: Biskra Province

Population (1998)
  - Total: 10,800
- Time zone: UTC+1 (CET)

Bouchagroune is a town and commune in Biskra Province, Algeria. According to the 1998 census it has a population of 10,800.
