= El Hadjeb =

Coordinates: 34°47′25″N 5°35′49″E

El Hadjeb ⵍⵃⴰⴵⴻⴱ الحاجب
- Commune and town
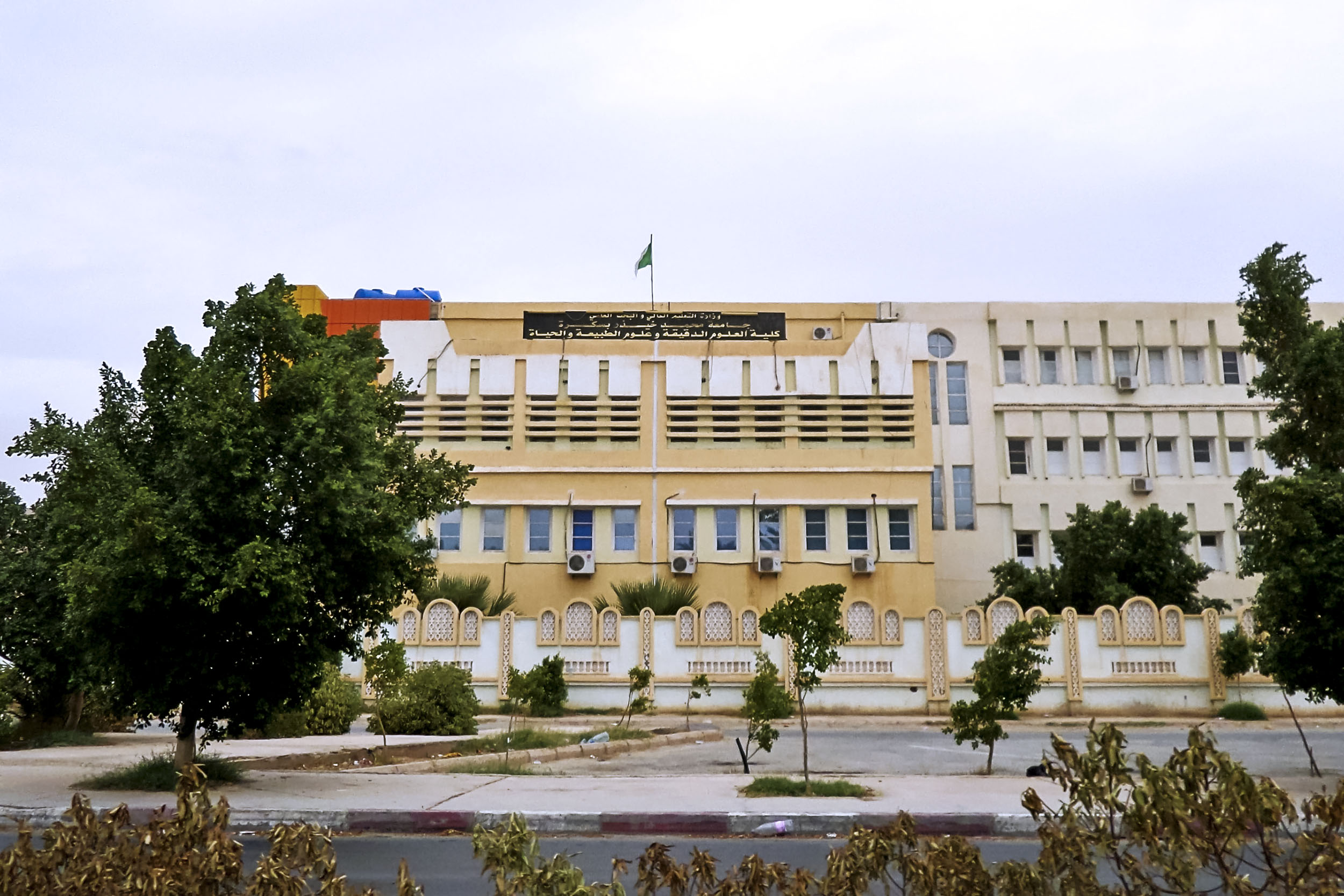
- El Hadjeb university
- Interactive map of El Hadjeb
- Country: Algeria
- Province: Biskra Province

Population (2008)
  - Total: 10 126
  - Density: 130/sq mi (49/km^{2})
- Time zone: UTC+1 (CET)

El Hadjeb is a town and commune in Biskra Province, Algeria. According to the 2008 census it has a population of 10,126.
