= Aïn Naga =

Coordinates: 34°41′18″N 6°05′19″E

- Commune and town
- Interactive map of Aïn Naga
- Country: Algeria
- Province: Biskra Province

Population (1998)
  - Total: 10,054
- Time zone: UTC+1 (CET)

Aïn Naga is a town and commune in Biskra Province, Algeria. According to the 1998 census it has a population of 10,054.
