= Branis =

Coordinates: 34°58′N 5°46′E

- Commune and town
- Country: Algeria
- Province: Biskra Province

Population (2014)
  - Total: 8,251
- Time zone: UTC+1 (CET)

Branis is a town and commune in Biskra Province, Algeria. According to the 1998 census it has a population of 4,976.
