= Djedi River =

Coordinates: 34.65°N 5.9166667°E

- Native name: وادي الجدي (Arabic)

Location
- Country: Algeria

Physical characteristics
- Source
  - location: Saharan Atlas
  - elevation: 1,400 m (4,600 ft)
- Mouth
  - location: Chott Melrhir
  - elevation: −40 m (−130 ft)
- Length: 480 km (300 mi)

Djedi River, also called Djeddi River, Oued Djedi or Ouad-ed-Djedi (Arabic: وادي الجدي Wādī al-Jadī) is a wadi (river with intermittent stream) in Algeria and one of the largest rivers of Sahara. It starts in the Saharan Atlas mountains, at elevation of about 1,400 meters (4,600 ft), flows for about 480 kilometers (300 mi) approximately from west to east, and discharges into Chott Melrhir lake at about –40 meters (130 ft) below mean sea level, which is the lowest point of Algeria. It is fed by rains and melting snow and has a permanent flow only in its upper part. The river rises on the southern slopes of Djebel Amour, near the town of Aflou, and feeds several date palm groves, such as the Laghouat oasis, which largely depend on this supply; water is also taken from numerous wells dug near the river. During the rain season in winter, the river helps to rise the water level of Chott Melrhir, and in summer, the lake and lower reaches of the river dry out. The river is up to several kilometers wide, but its banks are rarely covered with water. The river bed mostly consists of gypsum and mud and bears traces of erosion associated with the large variations of the flow. Although the soil in and around the river appears arable, it is barren due to the high concentration of salt. For the same reason, the soil absorbs much condensation overnight that keeps it partly humid during much of the day.

The river has numerous wadi tributaries, including Bedjran, Bicha, Mlili, Msaad and Mzi, all of those flowing from the left and none being navigable. Djedi River flows near the town of Laghouat (population about 125,000), and the town of Sidi Khaled (population ~40,000) stands on its left (northern) bank. The river's name is thought to be derived from the Berber languages Irzer Idjdi meaning river of sand which transformed into Arabic Ouad Djedi (meaning the river of the goat).
