= Djemorah =

Coordinates: 35°04′N 5°50′E

- Commune and town
- Interactive map of Djemorah
- Country: Algeria
- Province: Biskra Province

Population (1998)
  - Total: 11,218
- Time zone: UTC+1 (CET)

Djemorah or Djemourah is a town and commune in Biskra Province, Algeria. According to the 1998 census it has a population of 11,218.
