= Chetma =

- Commune and town
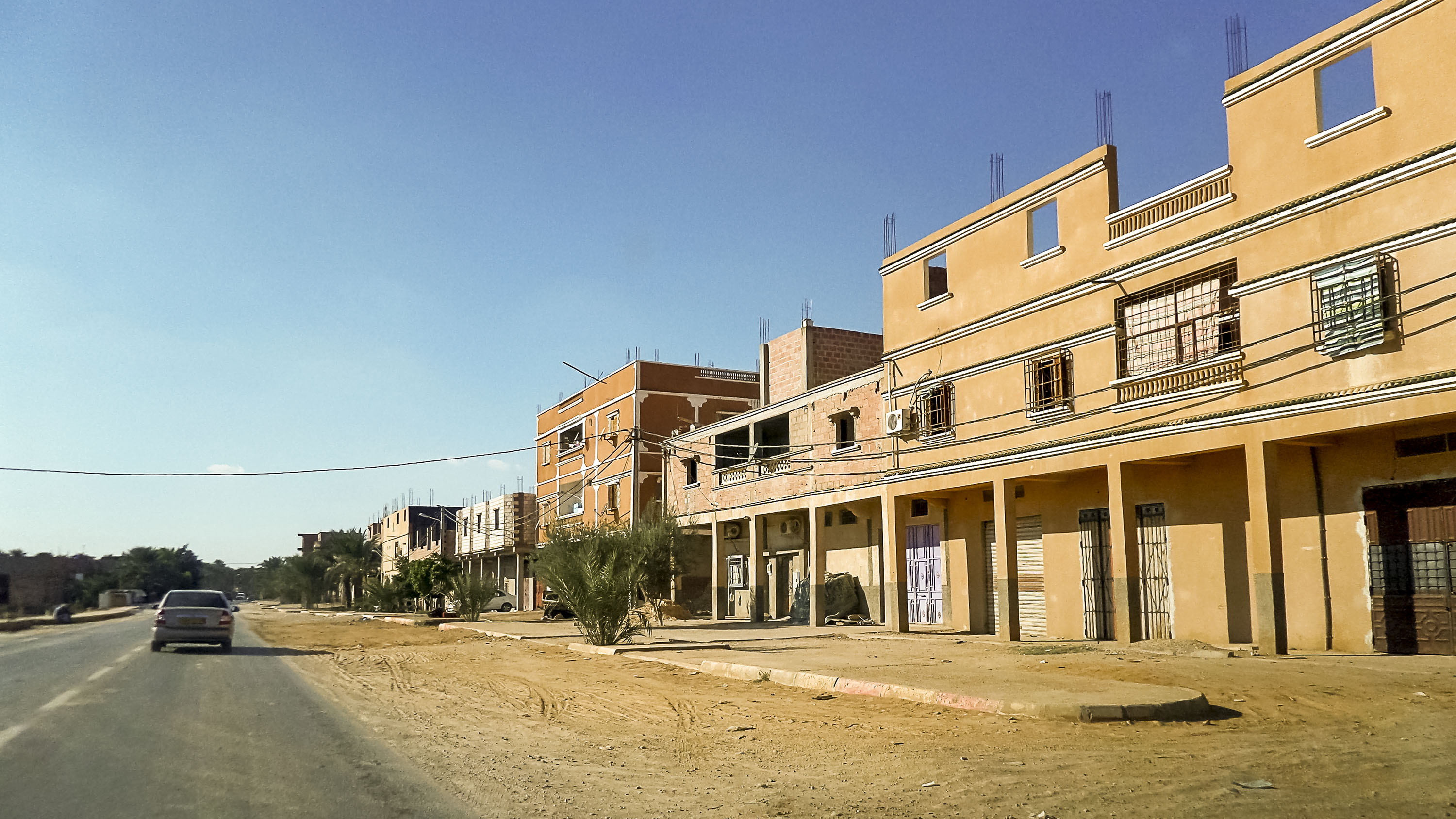

- Location within Algeria
- Coordinates: 34°51′N 5°49′E
- Country: Algeria
- Province: Biskra Province

Population (1998)
  - Total: 8,677
- Time zone: UTC+1 (CET)

Chetma is a town and commune in Biskra Province, Algeria. According to the 1998 census it has a population of 8,677.
