= Oumache =

Coordinates: 34°42′N 5°41′E

- Commune and town
- Interactive map of Oumache
- Country: Algeria
- Province: Biskra Province

Population (1998)
  - Total: 8,175
- Time zone: UTC+1 (CET)

Oumache is a town and commune in Biskra Province, Algeria. According to the 1998 census it has a population of 8,175.
