= El Outaya =

- Commune and town
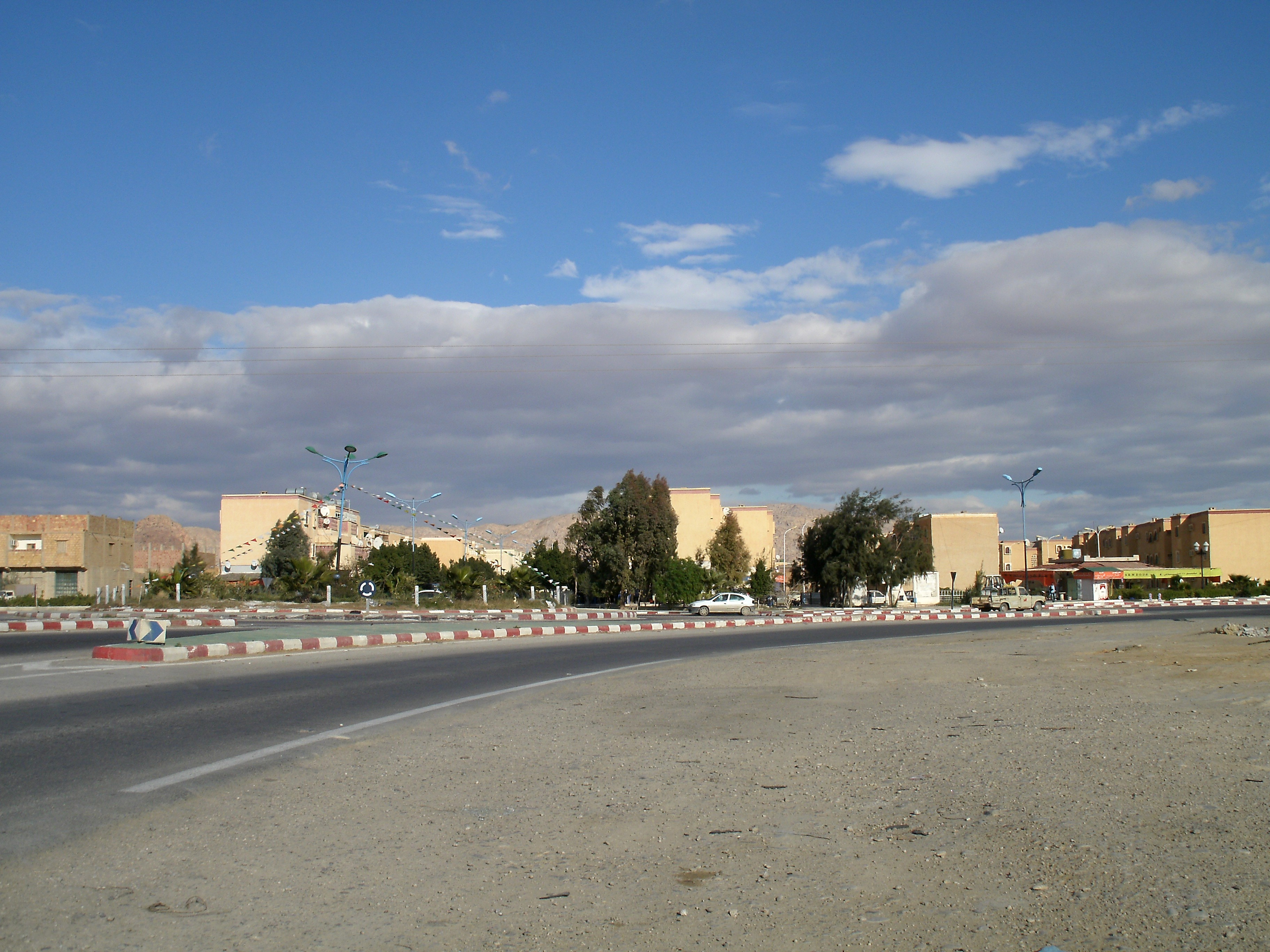

- Location within Algeria
- Coordinates: 35°1′12″N 5°21′36″E
- Country: Algeria
- Province: Biskra Province

Population (1998)
  - Total: 8,787
- Time zone: UTC+1 (CET)

El Outaya is a town and commune in Biskra Province, Algeria. According to the 1998 census it has a population of 8,787.
