= Biskra Province =

Province of Algeria

Biskra Province ولاية بسكرة
- Province
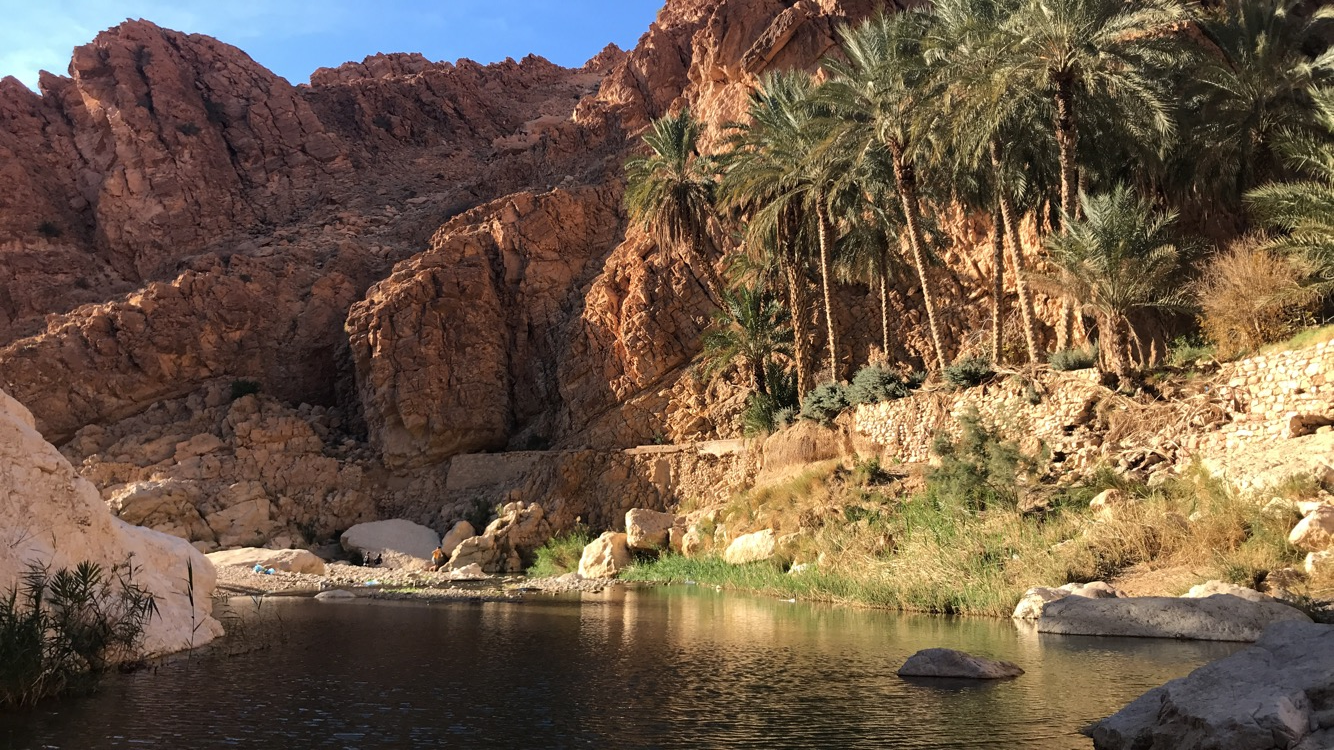

- Map of Algeria highlighting Biskra
- Coordinates: 34°52′N 05°45′E
- Country: Algeria
- Capital: Biskra

Government
  - PPA president: Mr. Guerbaz Toumi
  - Wāli: Mr. Lakhdar Seddas

Area
  - Total: 9,576 km^{2} (3,697 sq mi)

Population (2015)
  - Total: 869,215
  - Density: 90.77/km^{2} (235.1/sq mi)
- Time zone: UTC+01 (CET)
- Area Code: +213 (0) 33
- ISO 3166 code: DZ-07
- Districts: 11
- Municipalities: 27

Biskra (Arabic: ولاية بسكرة, Berber: ⴱⴻⵙⴽⵔⴰ) is a province (wilaya) of Algeria with its capital at Biskra. It is located on the northern edge of the Algerian Sahara, south of the Atlas Mountains.

Geographically, Biskra Province is arid, but oases and rivers can be found, such as the Djedi River which flows through the province. The mountainous Aurès region also extends into the province.

Biskra Province is home to the district of Tolga, which is well-known internationally for its high-quality Deglet Nour dates. Other localities include Lichoua, Sidi Okba, Sidi Khaled, and El-Kantara.

In 2019, several communes were removed from the province to form the new Ouled Djellal Province.

== History ==
=== Berber tribes ===
The Biskra area has been inhabited since at least the 3rd millennium BC, when the Gaetuli, an ancient Berber tribe, arrived in North Africa. They settled in the Aurès region, where they posed problems to Roman infiltration in the 3rd century BC as they were stellar horsemen and became dreaded in combat. Eventually, Roman politician Gaius Marius negotiated exploration of the South against concessions of agricultural land around Cirta and Setifis (at the time under Roman rule), and dispersed them and diminished their strength.

=== Roman occupation ===
The Biskra area experienced many violent wars during Roman colonization, including the resistance war led by the Berber leader Tacfarinas, followed by his successor, the militant Jugurtha "Youghorta". With the help of the inhabitants of the city of Biskra, who provided human and material support, Jugurtha destroyed the Roman army at the end of the so-called Numidia region.

The Romans also established the city of Tolga, and during their rule in the second century A.D., Syrian archers guarding the town of El Kantara were thought to have planted the first date palm grove in the region.

=== Post-independence ===
The province was created from parts of Oasis department and Batna (département) in 1974.

In 1984 El Oued Province was carved out of its territory.

== Administrative divisions ==
The province is made up of 11 districts and 27 communes or municipalities.

=== Districts ===
1. Biskra
2. Djemourah
3. Foughala
4. El Kantara
5. El Outaya
6. M'Chouneche
7. Ourlal
8. Sidi Khaled
9. Sidi Okba
10. Tolga
11. Zeribet El Oued

=== Communes ===
1. Aïn Naga
2. Aïn Zaatout
3. Biskra
4. Bordj Ben Azzouz
5. Bouchagroune (Bouchagroun)
6. Branis
7. Chetma
8. Djemorah (Djemourah)
9. El Feidh (El Feïdh)
10. El Ghrous
11. El Hadjeb
12. El Haouch
13. El Kantara
14. El Outaya
15. Foughala
16. Khenguet Sidi Nadjil
17. Lichana
18. Lioua
19. M'Chouneche (M’Chounèche)
20. Mekhadma
21. Meziraa
22. M'Lili
23. Oumache (Oumach)
24. Ourlala (Ourlal)
25. Sidi Okba
26. Tolga
27. Zeribet El Oued
