= El Kantara =

El Kantara القنطرة
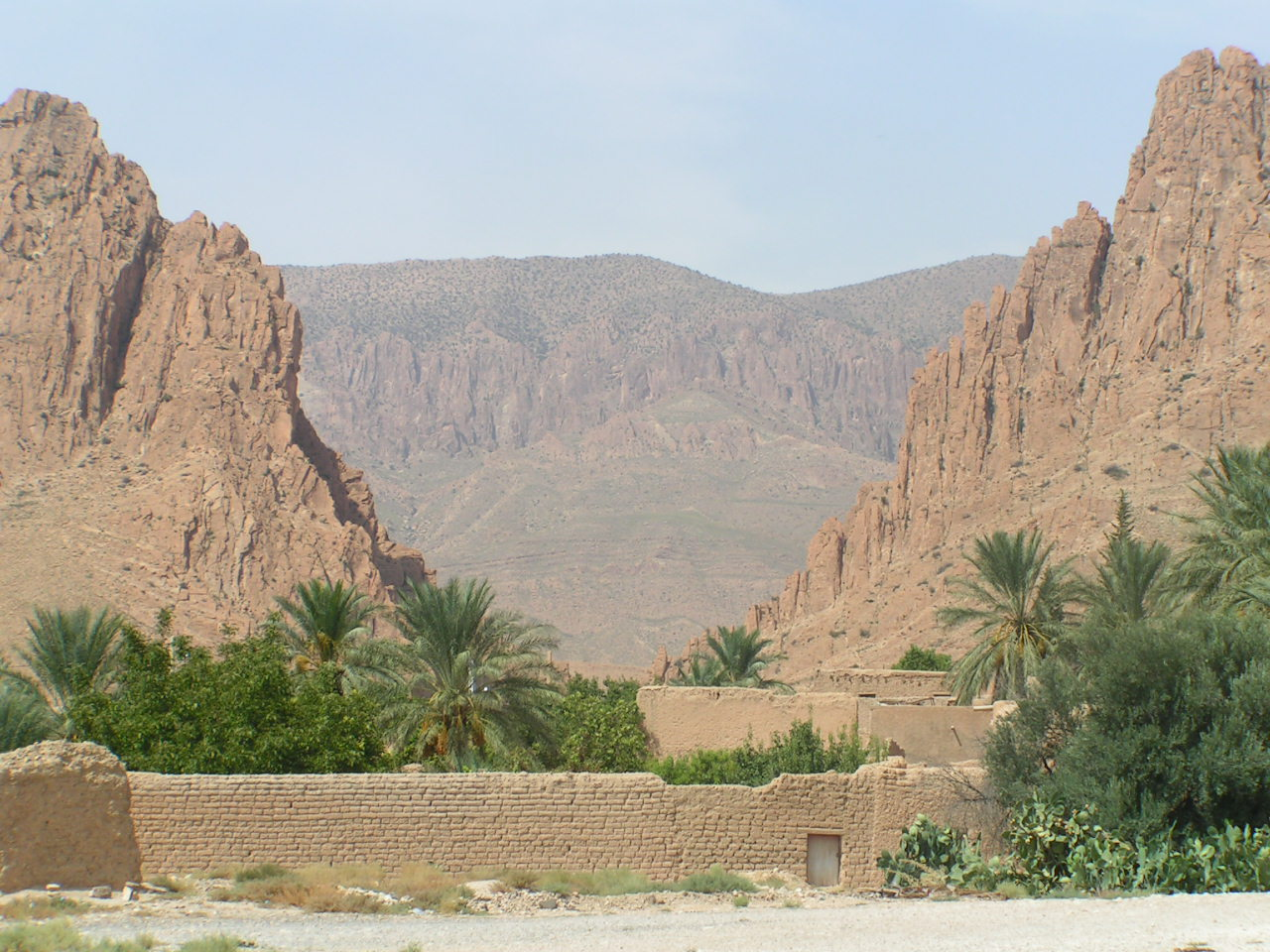

- Location within Algeria
- Coordinates: 35.2166°N 5.7104°E
- Country: Algeria
- Province: El Kantara Province
- Time zone: UTC+1 (CET)

El Kantara (El Kantara "الكنترة" word comes from Latin "Centuriation" (Derja: meaning a bridge)) is a town and commune in the eponymous El Kantara Province, serving as the provincial capital. The 1911 Baedeker travel guide described it as "one of the most important caravan-stations in E. Algeria." The town is well known for the eponymous gorge nearby, described by locals as the "Mouth of the Desert".

The gorge is narrow, at only 40 metres (130 ft) wide, but the walls can be as high as 120 m (390 ft).

== History ==
Roman soldiers of the Third Augustan Legion dubbed the gorge Calceus Herculis (English: Hercules' Kick), in reference to the divine hero Hercules' legendary strength. They also constructed an arched bridge over the river in the bottom of the gorge, in order to allow caravans and military supplies to pass through the town with ease.

In the second century A.D., the town and bridge were guarded by Syrian archers who are thought to have planted the first date palm grove in the region.

== Present infrastructure ==
A highway and railroad follow the same path as the ancient Roman road through the town.

== Notable people ==
- Saïd Chengriha, senior military leader

== Gallery ==
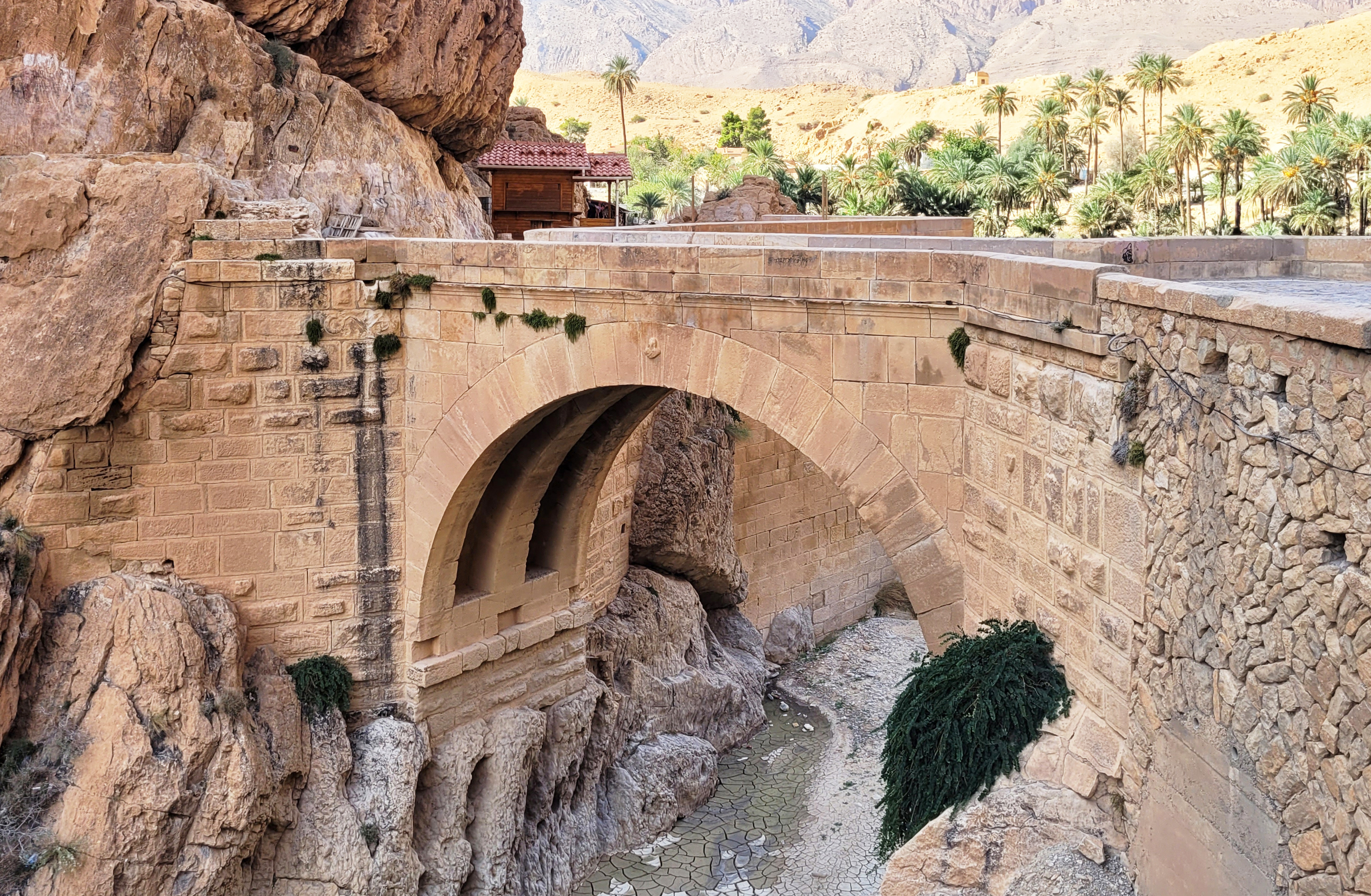
Above the Roman bridge in Kantara Gorge

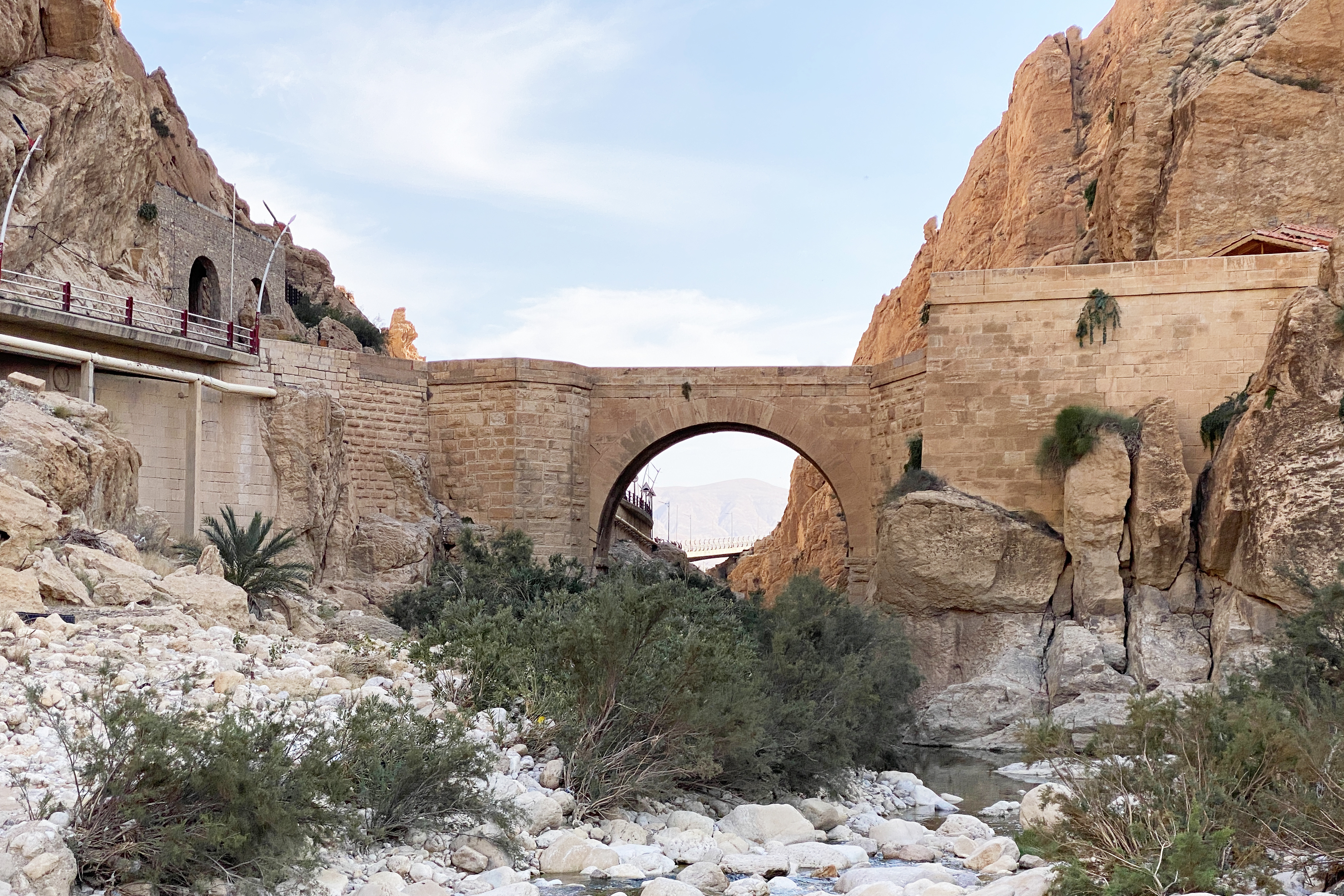
Below the bridge

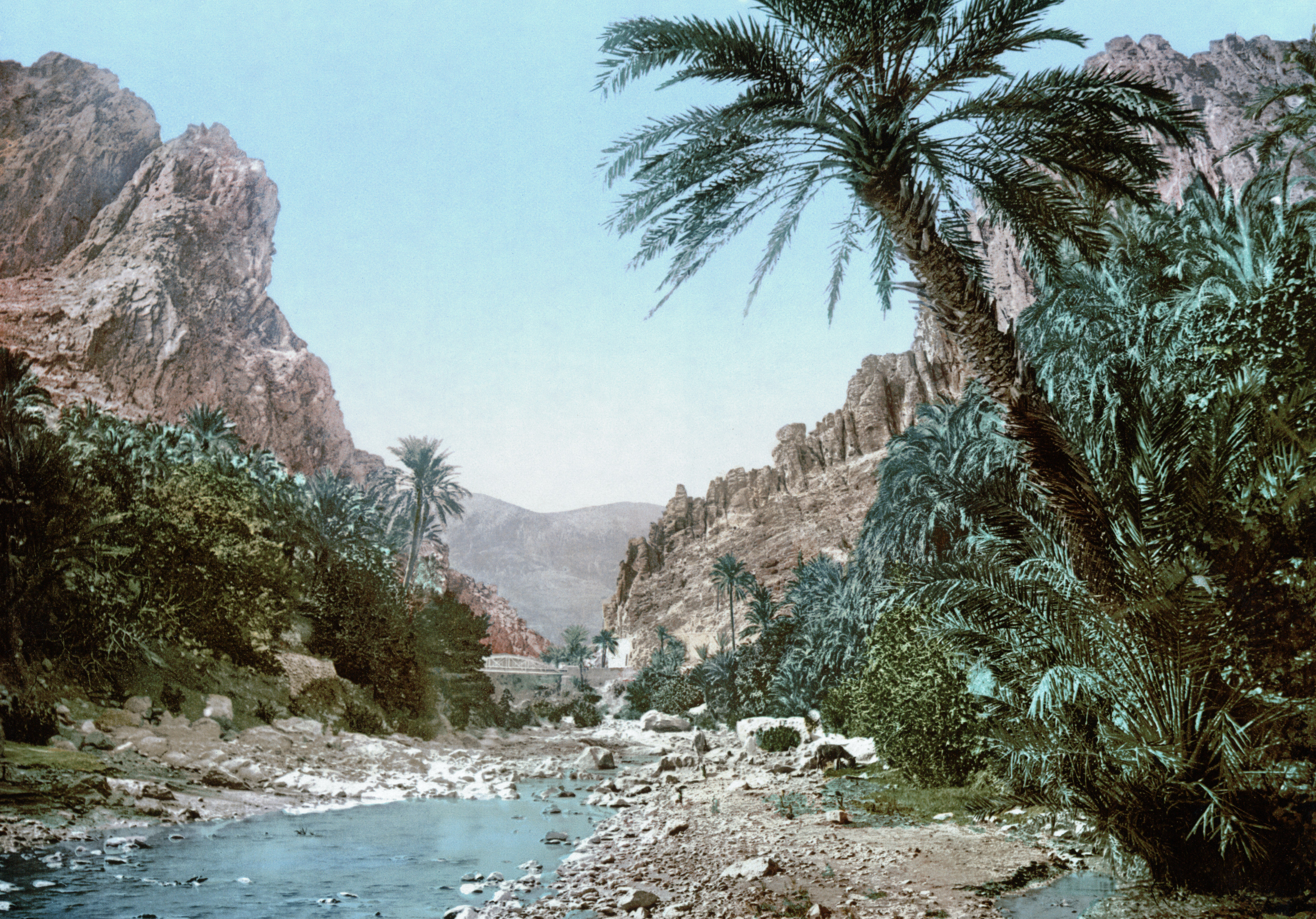
El Kantara

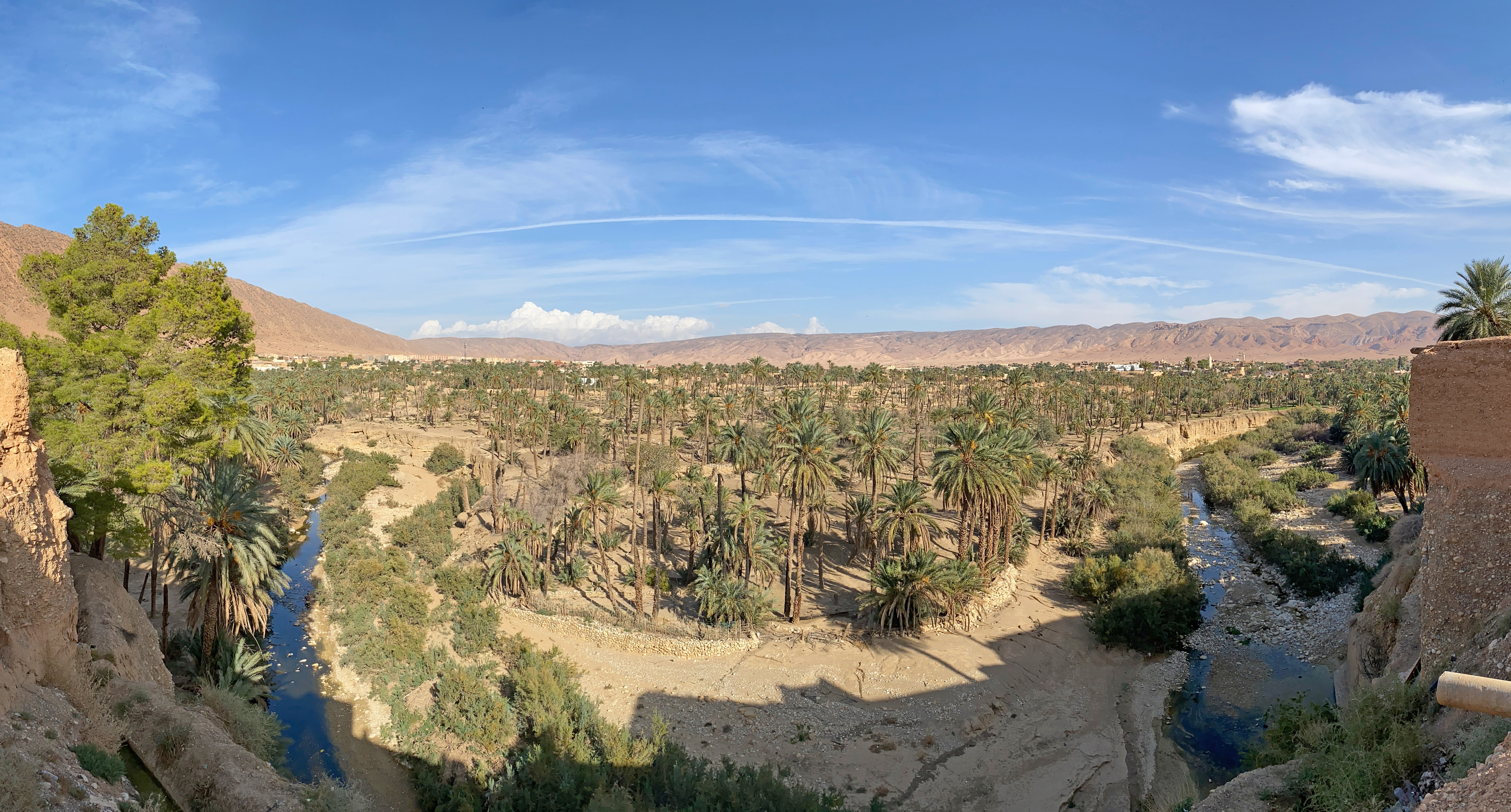
Palm trees in El Kantara

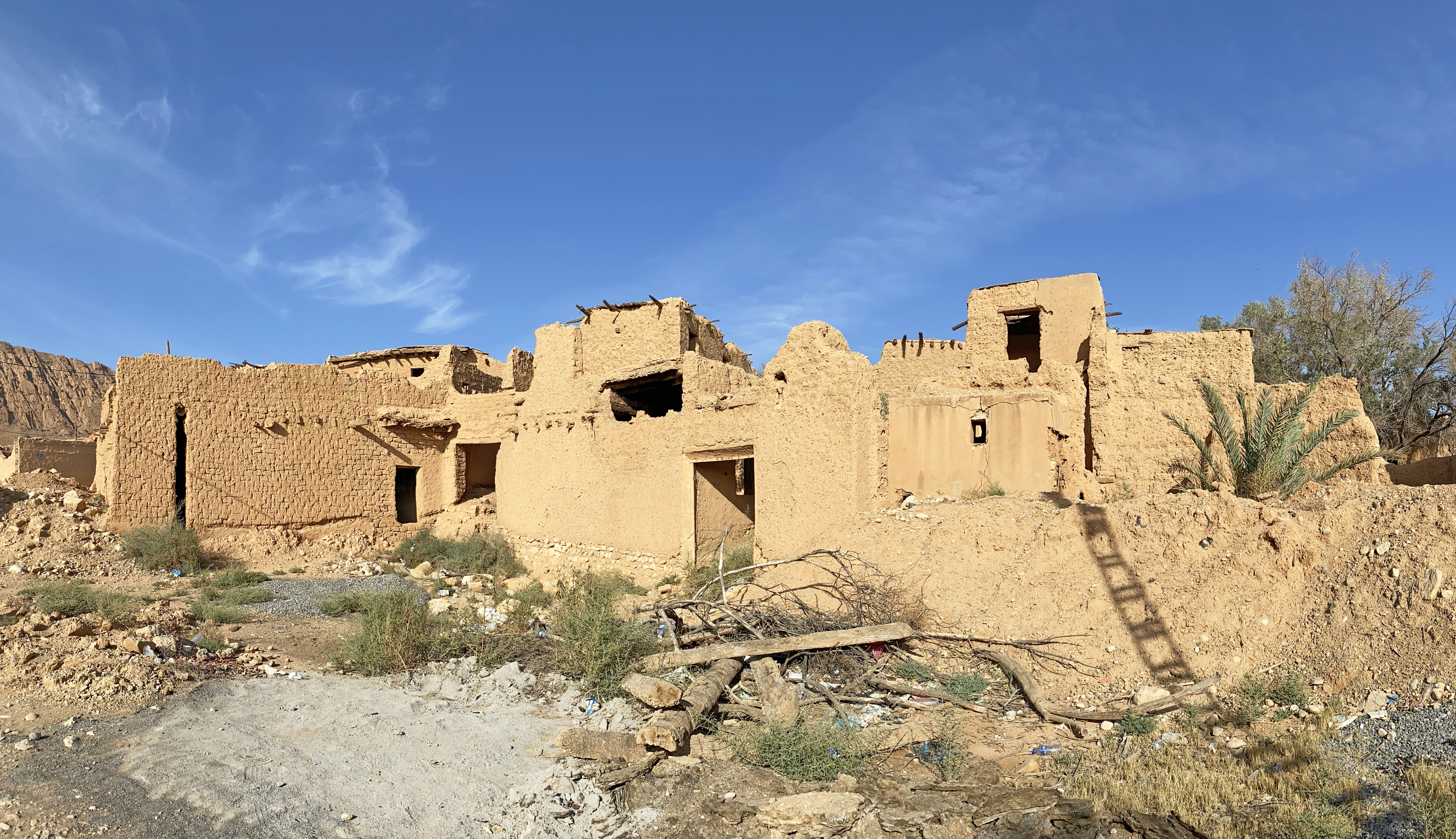
The Red Village

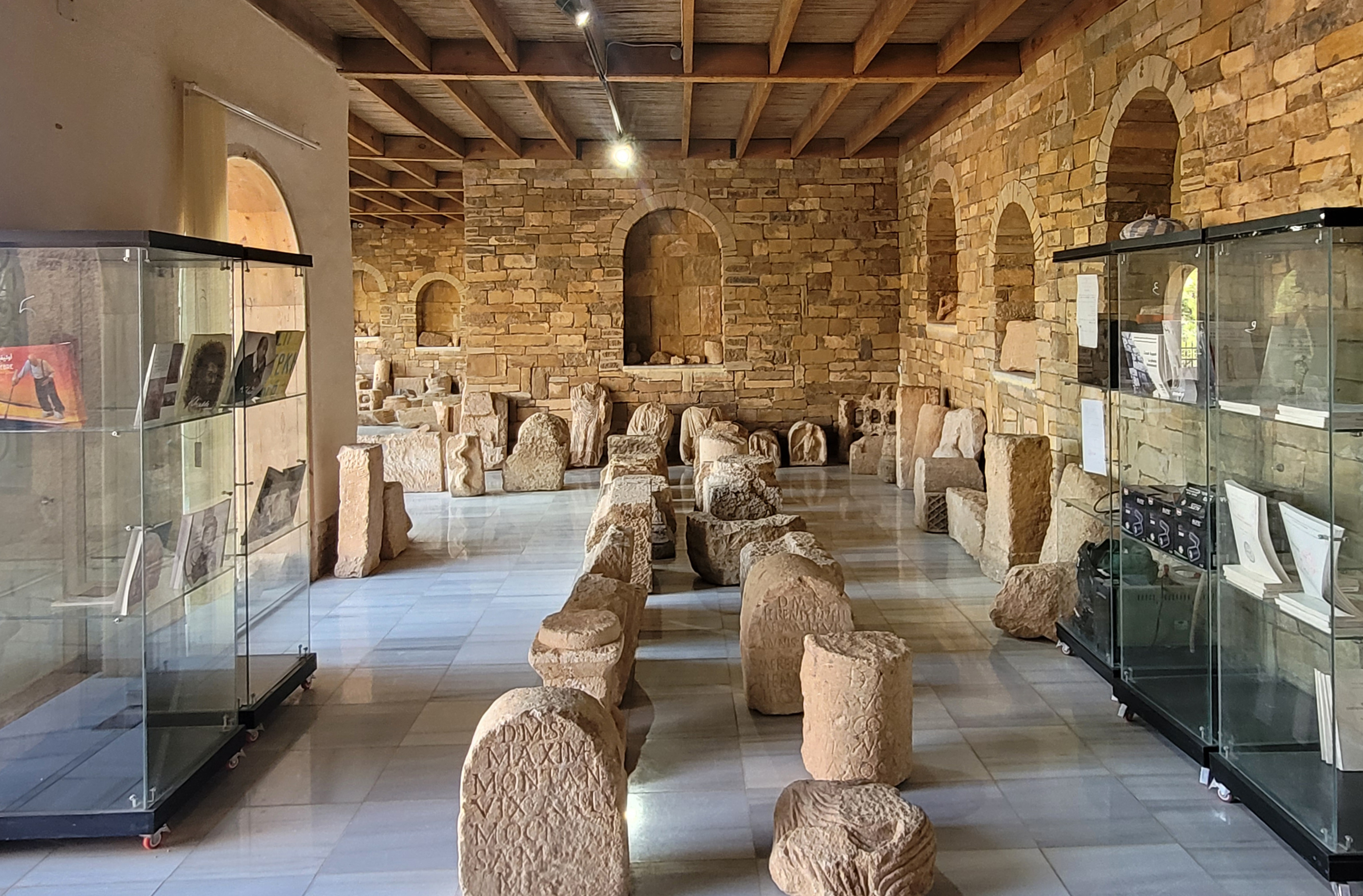
Archaeological museum
