= Tolga, Algeria =

Place in Biskra Province, Algeria

Coordinates: 34°43′N 5°23′E

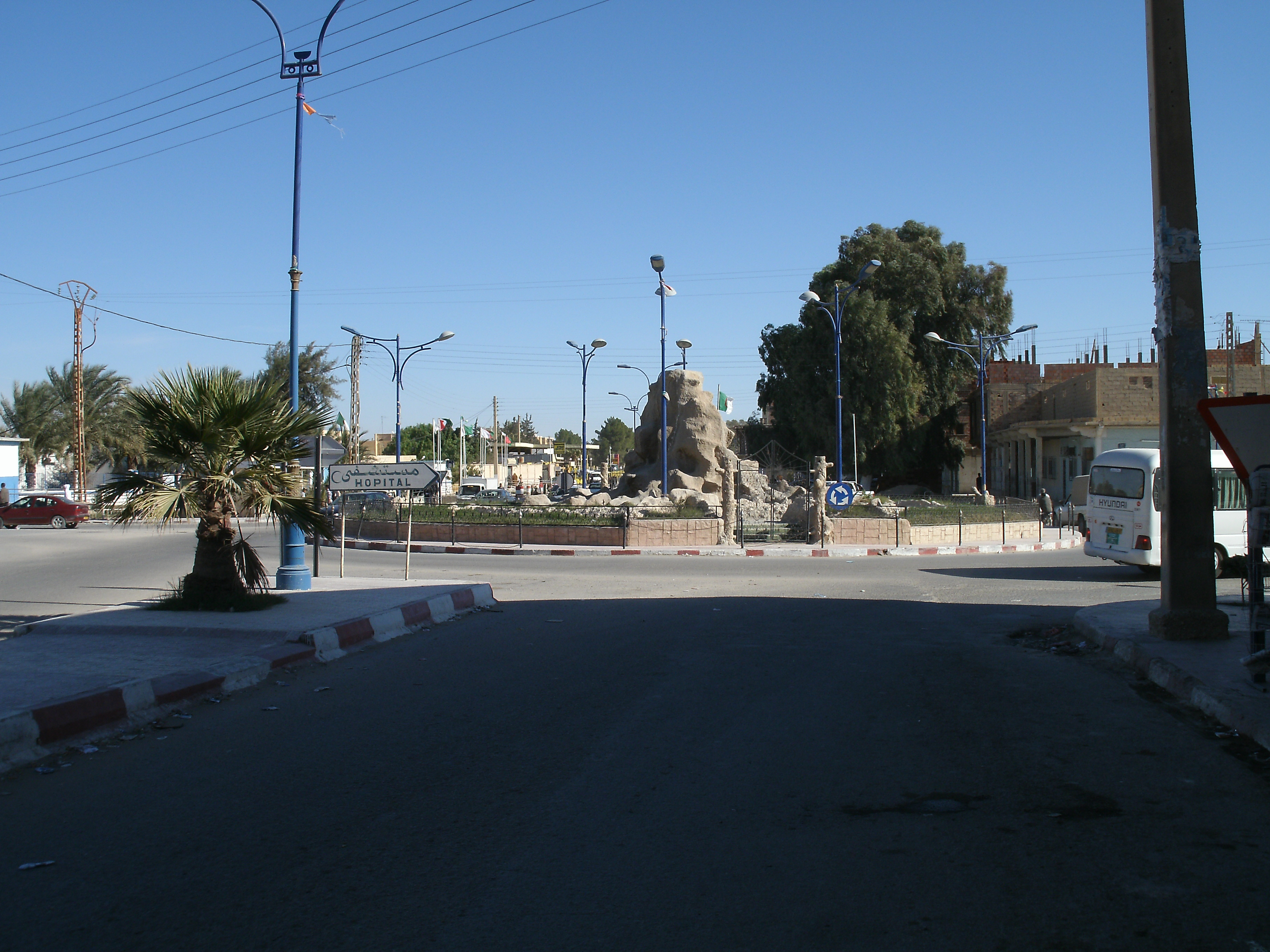
Tolga town centre.

Tolga (Arabic: طولقة) is a municipality in Biskra Province, Algeria. It is located in south-east Algeria, 380 km south of the capital Algiers (34° 43' 00" N and 5° 23' 00" E). Tolga is well known internationally for high-quality dates (Deglet Nour). It has more than 900,000 date palm trees. Most dates produced are exported.

== History ==
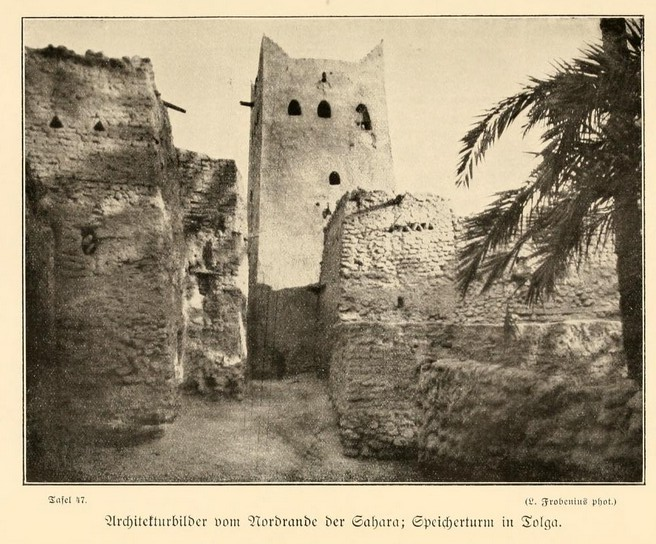
Tolga 1911.

The Tolga Oasis was established by the Romans. Many rectangular stones from the Roman era have been found in old Tolga, testifying to their presence in this oasis.

The city was the headquarters of the powerful Confederation of Dhouaouda and Ryah from Beni Hilal, a Bedouin clan from southern Egypt where they have migrated under the leadership of the Fatimids between the 10th and 11th centuries.

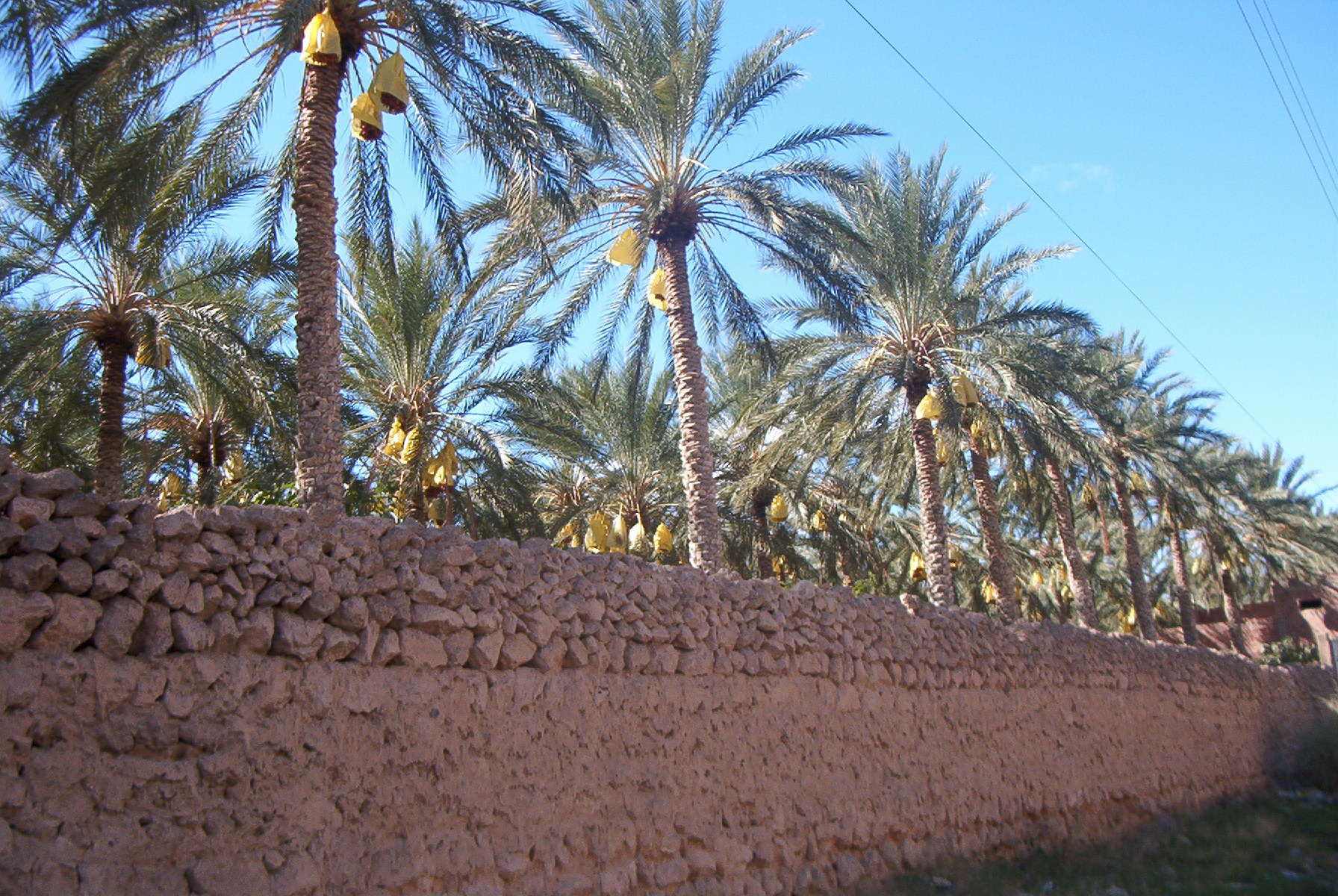
Deglet nour Dates at Tolga

According to the Andalusian historian and geographer Al-Bakri, "Tolga next to Farfar and Bourdj ben Azzouz and many other towns in this region make the biggest oisis in Algeria and North Africa, One of those cities are inhabited by Arabs and Amazigh origins. "
