= Arab–Islamic nationalism =

Political and religious ideology

Arab–Islamic nationalism (Arabic: القومية العربية الإسلامية, romanized: al-qawmīya al-ʿarabīya al-islāmiyyah) is a political and religious ideology that fuses Arab nationalism, which is otherwise generally secular in nature, with Islamism. It is prevalent among some Arab Muslims on the basis of the early Muslim conquests and the accompanying socio-cultural changes across West Asia and North Africa and beyond. It may be closely associated with pan-Arabism, as evidenced by the pan-Arab colours that are derived from the legacy of the caliphates during the spread of Islam: black and white for the Rashidun, Abbasids, and Umayyads; green for Islam; and red for the Hashemites.

== Early instances ==
Elements of the ideology emerged after the Muslim conquest of Persia. Many Arab Muslims, including some leaders, held nationalistic tendencies in their approach to the Persians. This continued during the First Fitna in 656, which replaced the Rashidun Caliphate with the Umayyad Caliphate. There were strong tensions between Arabs and Persians.

Mistreatment of non-Arabs became a general rule under the Umayyad Caliphate. They were denied any positions in the government under Umayyad rule. Non-Arab Muslims had to pay taxes which were not imposed on Arab Muslims. Al-Hajjaj ibn Yusuf ordered the non-Arabs to speak Arabic, and it was sometimes enforced.

After the Second Fitna, the Umayyads launched a campaign of simultaneous Islamization and Arabization. Arabic became the sole official language of the Umayyad state. Umar ibn Abdulaziz introduced some reforms to improve the situation of non-Arab Muslims, also referred to as mawali. Since non-Arabs who converted to Islam were no longer required to pay jizya, the Umayyads did not encourage conquered nations to accept Islam, and attempted to limit Islam to Arabs.

Non-Arab Muslims later joined the Abbasid Revolution, officially ending the Umayyad Caliphate. In the Umayyad hierarchy, Arab Muslims were first, followed by Non-Arab Muslims, followed by Dhimmis, followed by slaves. The Umayyads initiated Arabization campaigns in the Levant, Mesopotamia, Persia, the Maghreb, Iberia, and Central Asia.

The Umayyads later became a symbol of Arab nationalism. The white in pan-Arab colors represents the Umayyads.

== History ==
The ideology officially emerged as an organized ideology towards the end of the Ottoman Empire. Early Arab nationalists believed that the Arabs existed as a nation prior to the rise of nationalism in the Ottoman Empire, and that the Arabic language and Islam were pillars of the Arab nation. In the 1860s, Arab nationalist literature in the Mashriq strongly criticised Ottoman Turks for "betraying Islam" and Arabs. They claimed that the Ottomans had deviated from Islam and thus suffered decline. They also criticized the Ottomans adopting certain Western policies, and accused the Ottomans of putting Islam in the bad situation it was in. Arab nationalist rejection of Ottoman authority was first seen in the 1860s, although it was limited since the ideology was small and new. Many Arab scholars viewed the Ottoman claim to the caliphate as an usurpation of Arab-Islamic leadership after the Ottomans captured Cairo from the Mamluks in 1517, abolishing the authority of the Abbasid Caliphate. Arab-Islamic nationalists regularly made similar claims about Turks. Sati' al-Husri, a pan-Arabist and a Muslim, wrote of how non-Arab peoples, especially the Turks, seized control of Islam after its initial Arab leadership. He claimed that the moment Turks converted to Islam, Islam became a tool of Turkish rule rather than Arab civilization. Michel Aflaq, despite being Christian, often claimed that the Islam practiced by Turks was incorrect, and that Turks did not understand Islam, using it only as a took of imperialism. Arab nationalists in the French Mandate of Syria regularly expressed regret over the Arab conquests of Central Asia, claiming that if Turks never converted to Islam, the caliphate would have still existed in Mecca. Iraqi educational texts during the rule of Saddam Hussein portrayed the Ottoman Turks as foreign imperialists who ruined Arab unity. In several cases, official rhetoric claimed that the Arabs should not have spread Islam to Turks, and that the Turks would later rule over the Arabs with tyranny and ignorance. Muhammad Jalal Kishk argued that Turkish domination over Islam after the Abbasid decline resulted in the spread of irrational Sufism, absolutism, and cultural stagnation, saying. He also stated that the moment Arabs lost the Islamic leadership, the Turks kept Islam alive by name yet destroyed its meaning.

The Association of Algerian Muslim Ulama, founded in 1931, also adhered to the ideology. Its motto was "Islam is our religion, Algeria is our homeland, Arabic is our language". It emphasized on Algeria being a fully Arab and Islamic nation. Its founder, Abdelhamid ibn Badis, stated that the three main components of the Algerian national character consisted of Islam, Arabism, and nationalism.

Amin al-Husseini was another advocate of the ideology. Rashid Rida called for a restored Arab-led caliphate, believing that only the Arabs could faithfully lead the ummah. Hasan al-Banna emphasized that the Islamic revival in Egypt was inseparable from the Arab character of Egypt, and saw Arab lands as the natural heart of the ummah. The Syrian Muslim Brotherhood, particularly during the 1970s–80s, framed its opposition to the Assad government as both an Islamic and Arab-nationalist struggle.

The Arab–Israeli conflict strengthened the role of Islam as a defining feature of Arab nationalism. The humiliation felt by the Arabs in the 1948 Arab–Israeli War strengthened Pan-Arabism. Pan-Arabism was initially a secular movement. Arab nationalists generally rejected religion in politics, and believed that Arabs were Arabs regardless of religion. However, with Islam being the majority religion among Arabs, it was obvious that Islam would assert some influence on Arab nationalism. Michel Aflaq, a Christian, viewed Islam as an example of the "Arab genius", and once stated that "Muhammad was the epitome of all the Arabs. So let all the Arabs today be Muhammed." They claimed that Islam had given Arabs a "glorious past", unlike the "shameful present".

Albert Hourani noted that a significant amount of Arab Muslims remained attached to the idea that Arab leadership in Islam was both natural and providential because of the language of the Quran and the origin of Muhammad.

The ideology declined in Iraq under Abdul-Karim Qasim, who was against both Arab nationalism and Islamism. Nationalism was unpopular among Shia Arabs in Iraq, and they saw Arab nationalism as "a Sunni project" to establish "Sunni hegemony", due to the movement being dominated by Sunnis.

The relationship of Arab nationalism and Islam worsened, and Arab nationalism declined after the Israeli victory in the 1967 Six-Day War, in which the Arab nationalist movement faced an "irreversible" shift to "political marginality". During the Arab Spring, secular Arab nationalism further declined. As many Arabs were disgusted by the corruption of secular Arab nationalists, there was an "increasingly violent competition between the state and political Islam for the loyalty, as well as for the hearts and minds of the Arab citizen".

After the decolonization of Morocco, there was a growing movement aiming for the official implementation of "Arabo-Islamic culture". When the Istiqlal Party took power, it was successfully implemented.

In October 1963, Ahmed Ben Bella released the Algerian constitution, which asserted that Islam was the state religion, Arabic was the sole national and official language, Algeria was an integral part of the Arab world, and that Arabization was the first priority of the country to reverse French colonization. While trying to build an independent nation-state, the Algerian government under Ahmed Ben Bella began a policy of Arabization, motivated by Islam and nationalism. Algeria relied on Egyptian teachers belonging to the Muslim Brotherhood for religious education, due to the lack of Quranic Arabic speakers in Algeria. Houari Boumédiène drafted a new Algerian constitution in 1976, also dedicating it to Arab nationalism and Islam. He imposed Arab socialism as the state ideology and Islam as the state religion, and was more effective than Ahmed Ben Bella.

Omar al-Bashir advocated for the ideology, and implemented it during his rule in Sudan. Abdul Salam Arif, one of the leaders of the Ramadan Revolution, also adhered to the ideology. Khairallah Talfah drew criticism when he stated that "Islam without Arabism is Shu'ubiyya". Saddam Hussein was another advocate of the ideology, especially after June 1993, in which he launched the Faith Campaign with much help from Izzat al-Douri. The campaign aimed to promote Islamism and encourage religiosity in Iraqi society. The Iraqi Ba'ath Party was Islamized, although it maintained its Arab nationalism and continued to encourage it. This was described as a "full-scale politicisation of Islam" by Saddam Hussein, and marked a shift away from the secular rule of the 1980s and 1970s. Saddam Hussein viewed Islam as being synonymous to the Arab nation, stating that Arabs would decline without Islam, and Islam would decline without Arabs. He claimed that a "Muslim who hates the Arabs cannot be a Muslim, because the Arabs are the leading force of Islam as they are of all heavenly religions." Saddam Hussein and his supporters referred to the Iran–Iraq War as "Saddam's Qadisiyyah" (قادسية صدام, Qādisiyyat Ṣaddām), in reference to the Battle of al-Qādisiyyah, in which the Arabs defeated the Sasanians. Iraqi general Maher Abdul Rashid used chemical weapons on Iran, and referred to Iranians as "majusi insects".

== Views on other nations ==
Some Arab Muslims did not welcome Persian converts and saw them as usurpers. The Umayyads encountered the Turkic peoples during the Muslim conquest of Transoxiana led by Qutayba ibn Muslim. There were tensions between the Umayyads and the local Turks, and the Umayyad policies delayed the Turkic conversions to Islam. When the Abbasids emerged, Turks began converting to Islam on larger levels. Turks also sided with the Abbasids against the Tang dynasty.

Kurds formed alliances with Persians and revolted many times against the Umayyads. Kurdish communities became significant participants in the major uprising led by Abd al-Rahman ibn al-Ash'ath against Umayyad rule under Caliph Abd al-Malik ibn Marwan. Historical records indicate that ibn al-Ash'ath formed a coalition with Kurdish groups from the Saburan region of Fars province in 83 AH (702 CE). Several years later, in 90 AH (708 CE), the Iraqi provincial governor Al-Hajjaj ibn Yusuf took punitive action, including military campaigns against the Kurdish population of Fars in response to the disturbances they had caused throughout the province. By 117 AH (735 CE). However, the relations of the Umayyads with the Kurds greatly improved under Marwan II, who was born to a Kurdish mother. When the Umayyads collapsed, some of them were given refuge by the Kurds. Among them was a direct descendant of Marwan II, Adi ibn Musafir, the founder of Adawiyya, a heterodox tariqa which eventually evolved into Yazidism.

Hassan al-Banna, the founder of the Muslim Brotherhood, while rejecting nationalism and discrimination, believed that the real reason Islam declined was because of the transfer of authority from Arabs to non-Arabs.

The Umayyads began the Muslim conquest of the Maghreb led by Uqba ibn Nafi. The Umayyads faced strong resistance from the Berbers, led by Kahina and Kusaila in the 680s. In 687 AD Arab reinforcements arrived under Zuhayr ibn Qays, where they defeated and killed Kusaila in 688 AD at the Battle of Mamma. the Arabs under Hasan ibn al-Nu'man, defeated and killed Kahina at the Battle of Tabarka. Arab migrations to the Maghreb significantly increased, and by the 7th century, the Arabs overwhelmed the Berbers, gradually converting the Berbers to Islam and capturing the Maghreb. Umayyad caliph Hisham ibn Abd al-Malik continued the Arabization and stated "I will not leave a single Berber compound without pitching beside it a tent of a tribesman from Qays or Tamim". Berbers went on to launch the Berber Revolt. After Algerian independence, Ahmed Ben Bella implemented Arab nationalist and Islamist policies in his decolonization campaign, and repressed Berber cultural rights. In 1968, under Houari Boumediene, the Arabization and Islamization was extended. Berber opposition to the Arabization continued, and some Berbers, like the Kabyles, feared for their ancestral culture and language. After the Algerian Civil War, the government tried to further enforce the use of Arabic. In 2002, the state recognized the Berber language. However, the Algerian government continued the Arabization, citing the literary, religious, and symbolic advantage of the Arabic language, as well as Arabic being a single language as opposed to the diverse Berber languages which were not standardized. Although Islamism generally disapproved of nationalism, Islamists in Algeria often held Anti-Berber views.

Omar al-Bashir implemented Arab nationalist and Islamist policies, which included the arming of the Janjaweed and Muraheleen, who were motivated by the ideology during the Darfur genocide.
