= History of the Aurès =

The Aurès Mountains are located in northeastern Algeria and are part of the Saharan Atlas in the Maghreb region of Northwest Africa. The indigenous inhabitants of the Aurès are the Chaoui people, who are part of the broader Berber (Amazigh) community. The history of the Aurès dates back to prehistoric times.

== Prehistory ==
=== Aïn Hanech ===
Aïn Hanech is a Paleolithic archaeological site in the Aurès region that has provided evidence of hominin presence in North Africa as early as 1.7 million years ago (mya). Stone tools have been discovered in stratified archaeological layers at this site, dating to the Pleistocene epoch (2.5 mya–11,700 years ago). Archaeologist Mohamed Sahnouni and his colleagues uncovered Oldowan chipped stone tools, including simple faceted spherical stones, alongside animal fossils from the same epoch.

=== Capsian civilization ===
The Capsian civilization was widespread around the Mediterranean Sea from approximately 8000 to 2700 BCE. Evidence of Capsian settlements is found in their escargotières or middens, which are mounds containing archaeological materials such as ash, stone tools, animal bones (including those of gazelles, aurochs, and wildebeests), and land snail shells. Additionally, there is evidence of rock art, sculpting, polishing, pottery, and farming. Notable mound sites include Medjez Amar and Mechta Sidi El Arbi in the Constantine region.

== Antiquity ==
During antiquity, the Aurès region was inhabited by the Gaetuli (Zenata) and the Sanhaja, along with a minority of Garamantes. The Mausoleum of Medracen (also known as Medghassen), located in Boumia, north of the Aurès massif, dates back to 300 BCE. This Numidian monument is the oldest mausoleum in Algeria.

The Aurès region is believed to have been central to the Zenata people, including groups such as the Maghrawas, Banu Ifran, Djerawa, and Merinids. According to the contentious hypothesis proposed by Ibn Khaldun, Medghassen may have been the patriarch of the Zenata.

=== Massylii ===
The Massylii were an ancient Berber tribal confederation associated with the Numidian kingdom. The Aurès region was crucial to the Massylii, encompassing the majority of their territory and serving as a cultural nexus. Their capital, Cirta, was also located within this region.

=== Numidia ===
Born around 238 BCE into the Massylian tribe, Massinissa played a crucial role in unifying Numidia, including the Aurès region. After his reign, several of his successors, including his grandson Jugurtha, sought refuge on the high plateau now named after him. This plateau, located near the present-day city of Kalaat es Senam in Tunisia, close to the massif's border, became a stronghold for resisting Roman invasions.

=== Roman period ===
The Aurès region was home to several Roman settlements, including notable examples such as Timgad (Thamugadi), a well-preserved Roman city founded in the 1st century AD, and Cuicul (Djemila), renowned for its impressive Roman ruins. These settlements served as important hubs for trade, administration, and cultural exchange in the Roman province of Numidia.

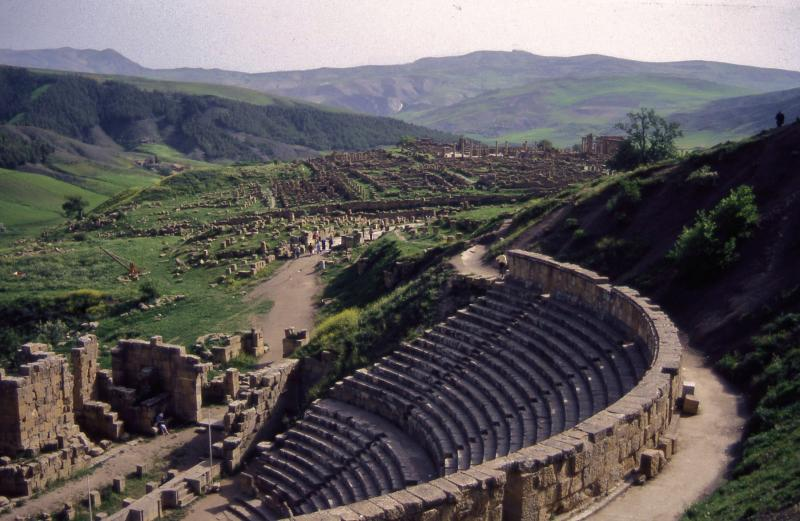

=== Kingdom of the Aurès ===
King Masties founded the Kingdom of the Aurès in the 480s as a Christian Berber realm. It emerged following Berber uprisings against the Vandal Kingdom, which had conquered the Roman province of Africa in 435 AD, and it remained an autonomous state thereafter.

The Kingdom of the Aurès played a significant role in defending North Africa during the Muslim conquest of the Maghreb. Its queen, Dihya, successfully defeated the Umayyad Arabs in the Battle of Meskiana. However, she either committed suicide or was killed during the subsequent Battle of Tabarka.

=== Arab rule ===
By 709, all of North Africa, including the Aurès, had come under the control of the Umayyad Caliphate. Following the Arab conquest, the Aurès underwent significant transformations. Arab governance introduced Islam to the region, profoundly influencing its cultural and societal structures.

Tribes such as the Banu Ifran, Maghrawa, and other Zenata tribes considered the Aurès their home before fleeing west to Western Algeria and Morocco due to the Abbasid Caliphate's conquest of North Africa.

After the Abbasids conquered Ifriqiya, they installed the vassal Aghlabids, who most likely controlled the Aurès.

== Middle Ages ==
=== Fatimid rule ===
In 902, a missionary named Abu Abdallah al-Shi'i led an army of Kutama Berbers, resulting in the foundation of the Fatimid Caliphate. They participated in significant battles in the Aurès against the Aghlabids, including those at Mila in 902, Constantine in 905, and Tubna in 906.

The Fatimids also spread Shia Islam in the Aurès, but this was later reversed by the Zirids after they converted to Sunni Islam in 1048.

=== Hammadids ===
The Hammadids did not contribute much to the region, as it was constantly under attack by the Hilalians. However, they did construct the Great Mosque of Constantine, which was later renovated by the Algerians in the 18th century.

The Hammadids also liberated Hodna from the Hilalians in the 12th century.

=== Hafsids of Béjaïa ===
The Aurès was an important region during the Hafsid occupation, as they first captured it in 1229, when Abu Zakariya Yahya declared independence while the Almohads were preoccupied with their internal struggles.

The Hafsids consolidated their rule over the city of Batna and the Aurès Mountains. However, by the 15th century, Constantine had gained full independence from the Hafsids, until the Spanish invasion led to the fall of the Hafsid dynasty.

=== Regency of Algiers ===
After the Spanish invasion, the Regency of Algiers succeeded in reconquering eastern Algeria, excluding the Aurès, which was controlled by various tribes. However, in 1542, Hasan Pasha arrived and successfully subdued the tribes, forcing them to pay tribute to Algiers.

During the late 17th century, several expeditions were launched against the Aurès, including those in 1710, 1755, 1771, and 1797.

The population of the Aurès refused to fight alongside Ahmed Bey ben Mohamed Chérif during the capture of Algiers in 1830.

== Modern period ==
=== French occupation ===
In 1954, the Aurès region became a central focus in the Algerian conflict. Mostefa Ben Boulaïd, born in Arris and affiliated with the extensive Touabas coalition, was one of the six initiators of the FLN that sparked the revolution in Algeria. It is worth noting that Mohamed Boudiaf, Rabah Bitat, and Larbi Ben M'hidi, all from eastern Algeria, shared Chaoui Berber heritage. The region was also known for hosting many significant battles during the Algerian War.

=== Post-independence ===
After Algeria gained independence in 1962, the Chaouis, like other Algerian communities, played a key role in rebuilding and shaping post-colonial society, participating in the political, economic, and social spheres.
