= Battle of Meskiana =

698 Umayyad defeat in Algeria

- Part of the Muslim conquest of North Africa
Date	698
Location	Nini River, Meskiana valley, in Algeria
Result	Berber victory
Territorial changes	Berbers repel the Umayyad advance

Belligerents
Umayyad Caliphate	Kingdom of the Aurès

Commanders and leaders
Hasan ibn al-Nu'man	Dihya

Strength
near 40,000 soldiers	A big army

Casualties and losses
heavy 80 captured	unknown

The maximum expansion of the Kingdom of Aures during the reign of Queen Dihya, and after the Battle of Maskiana in Oued Nini

The Battle of Meskiana occurred in North Africa in 698 between the Umayyad forces of Hassan ibn al-Nu'man and Queen Dihya.

== Background ==
According to the historian Ibn Idhari after destroying Carthage, Hassan ibn al-Nu'man inquired about the most powerful chief in all of Ifriqiya. He was told that it was Queen Dihya whom all the Berbers obeyed and that if he defeated her he would succeed in submitting the entire Maghreb, so he decided to go and face her.

In 698, Hassan moved west and marched toward Dihya’s realm, but when he reached Medjana, he decided to confront the Byzantines first. When Dihya learned of his arrival, she left her kingdom, then captured and demolished the city of Baghaya, believing that Hassan intended to use it as a fortified base.

When Hassan heard of this, he changed direction toward the Aurès Mountains and camped in the Meskiana Valley in front of the Nini River (in the Aurès Mountains, 18 miles from Baghaya). Kahina followed and camped in the same place. The Muslims drank from the upper part of the valley while the Berbers drank from the lower part. At the end of the day, horsemen from both sides gathered, and the two armies approached until they were within striking distance. However, Hassan decided not to fight and to wait until the following morning, and Dihya did the same. The two adversaries did not return to their camps but spent the night in their saddles—that is, they remained on guard on their horses throughout the night.

== Battle ==
In the morning, the battle broke out, and the two sides fought fiercely and with great endurance, believing it to be a fight to the death. In the end, likely due to the Berbers’ familiarity with the terrain, Hassan ibn al-Nu'man was defeated. Many Muslims were killed, and 80 Arabs among Hassan’s companions were taken captive.

== Aftermath ==
After the battle, Dihya pursued Hassan until she reached Gabes, and Hassan fled Ifriqiya. When he reached Cyrenaica, he wrote to Abd al-Malik ibn Marwan: “The nations of the Maghreb have no end, and none of them ever truly disappear. Whenever one nation perishes, another succeeds it. They are numerous and plentiful, like grazing livestock.” Abd al-Malik replied and ordered him to settle in Barqa, where he would remain for five years.

As for Queen Dihya, after the battle she became the uncontested ruler of Ifriqiya for around five years, though she did not enter Kairouan. She made alliances with the Byzantines and divided the land with them, giving them the coastal regions. L

After the battle, the valley came to be known as “Oued al-Adhara” (Valley of the Maidens), and the river was named “River of al-Balaa” (River of Calamity), after the misery and suffering the Muslims endured there.
