= Battle of El Jem =

703 Umayyad victory in Tunisia

- Part of the Muslim conquest of North Africa
| Date | September-October 703 |
| Location | Amphitheatre of El Jem and its surroundings |
| Result | Umayyad victory |
| Territorial changes | The recapture of Tripoli and central Maghreb and most of Ifriqiya |

Belligerents
| Umayyad Caliphate; Muslim Berbers | Kingdom of the Aurès |

Commanders and leaders
| Hassan ibn al-Nu'man | Dihya |

Strength
| 40,000 soldiers | Unknown, but large |

The Battle of El Jem was a military engagement fought between the Umayyad Caliphate and the Kingdom of the Aurès. The battle took place near Amphitheatre of El Jem, Tunisia, in 703. The battle resulted in a major victory for the Umayyads and the end of organized Berber resistance to the caliphate.

== Background ==
During the late 7th century, forces of the Arab-dominated Umayyad Caliphate conducted a decades-long conquest of the Maghreb, then under the nominal control of the Byzantine Empire. One major obstacle to the invasion was Dihya, the Berber queen of Aurés who had fought against the Muslim advance into Maghreb. In 698, she defeated the Umayyads at the Battle of Meskiana, temporarily halting Hassan ibn al-Nu'man's campaign to conquer Maghreb.

After the battle, Hassan fled to Cyrenaica and settled there on the orders of Caliph Abd al-Malik ibn Marwan. He remained there for five years. By 703, he was supplied with 40,000 soldiers and substantial funds. The citizens of Ifriqiya had sent requests asking for help and protection from Dihya’s scorched-earth campaign. After receiving reassurance from Khalid ibn Yazid al-Qaysi, the Muslim captive and informer in Dihya’s custody and her adopted son, Hassan decided to advance.

== Battle ==
Before entering Ifriqiya, Hassan sent Hilal ibn Tharwan al-Liwati on a raid. When Hassan entered Ifriqiya, he was obeyed and supported by locals who opposed Dihya. Gabes, Gafsa, and the entire Djerid region pledged allegiance to him.

When she heard of his arrival, Dihya gathered many Berber tribes to resist the new invasion. She fortified herself in the Amphitheatre of El Jem. During the night, Dihya saw a vision that she would be killed, so she sent her two sons, along with her adopted son Khalid ibn Yazid, to the Muslim camp, where they converted to Islam, while Khalid took command of the cavalry.

In Ramadan (September–October 703), the battle began. It was described as "fierce". Dihya went out to fight with her hair loose. The fighting became so intense that people believed it to be a battle of annihilation, but it ended in a victory for the Muslims, the flight of Dihya, and the end of organized Berber resistance to the Islamic expansion.

== Aftermath ==
Dihya fled the battlefield and was pursued by Hassan until he caught and killed her near Bir al-Kahina (al-Kahina’s Well) in the Aurès Mountains. Other sources claim she was killed in Tabarka.

After the battle, the Berbers who had fought with Dihya asked for safety. Hassan granted them protection on the condition that they provide the Muslims with 12,000 soldiers from their tribes to fight in the conquest of the region and prove their loyalty to the Islam. This was done, and Hassan divided the Berber forces between Dihya’s two sons, each commanding 6,000 soldiers. They then set out to continue the conquests and fight the Christian Romans and non-Muslim Berbers. Islam spread among the Berbers, and after this great victory, Hassan returned to Kairouan.
