= Zuhayr ibn Qays =

Companion of Muhammad and Arab commander (died 688)

Zuhayr ibn Qays al-Balawi زهير بن قيس البلوي

Governor of Ifriqiya
- In office 683–688
- Monarchs: Mu'awiyah II; Marwan I Abd al-Malik
- Preceded by: Uqba ibn Nafi
- Succeeded by: Hassan ibn al-Nu'man

Personal details
- Died: 688
- Relations: Bali (tribe)
- Religion: Islam
- Burial place: As-Sahabah Mosque, Derna, Libya

Military service
- Allegiance: Rashidun Caliphate; Umayyad Caliphate
- Battles/wars: Muslim conquest of Egypt; Muslim conquest of the Maghreb; Battle of Vescera; Battle of Mamma

Zuhayr ibn Qays al-Balawī (Arabic: زهير بن قيس البلوي; died 688) was a companion of the Islamic prophet Muhammad and an Arab commander who fought in the service of the Rashidun, Umayyad and Zubayrid caliphs. He played a key role in the early Muslim conquests of Egypt, Barqa (Cyrenaica) and Ifriqiya. When the latter province fell to a Byzantine–Berber alliance in 682, Zuhayr was given command of the army to restore Arab rule. During that campaign, he temporarily retook Kairouan, the Arabs' capital in Ifriqiya, and killed the Berber chief Kasila, but was slain by Byzantine raiders on his way back to Barqa.

== Life ==
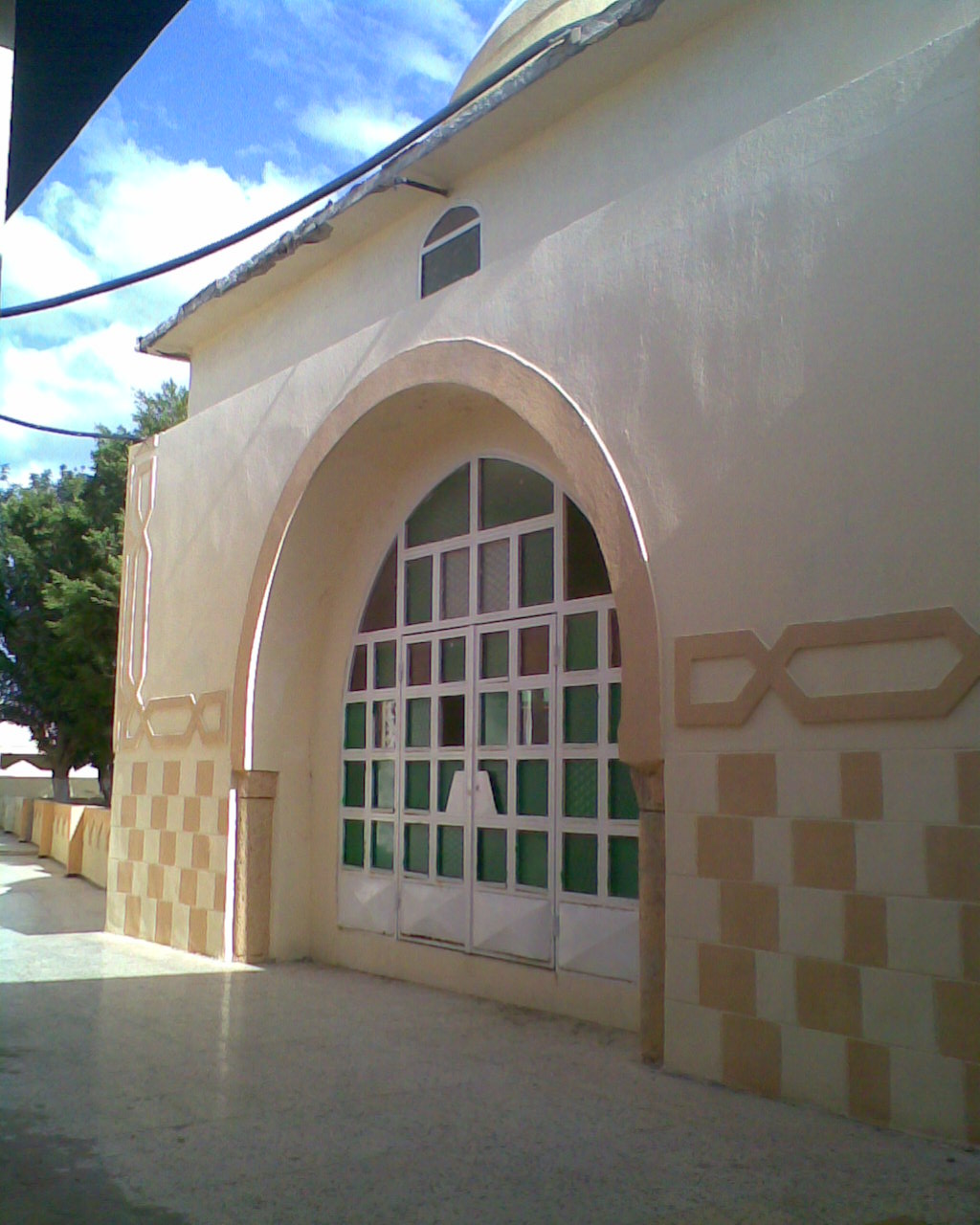
A doorway leading to the tomb of Zuhayr ibn Qays in the compound of the As-Sahabah Mosque located in Derna, Libya.

Zuhayr belonged to the Bali tribe, itself part of the larger Quda'a confederation that was present throughout Syria and the northern Hejaz. He is considered by some Muslim sources, namely Ibn Hajar and al-Suyuti, as a sahabi (companion) of the Islamic prophet Muhammad, while al-Suyuti also places him with the second-generation of Muslims, known as the tabi'un.

=== Military participation ===
According to Ibn Hajar, Zuhayr participated in the Muslim conquest of Egypt in 639. He later served as a lieutenant commander in the army of Uqba ibn Nafi during the Muslim conquest of the Maghreb in 670. In that campaign, he played a role in the capture of Sirte and was made its governor. The Arabs established the town of Kairouan in Ifriqiya to garrison their troops and families and when Uqba advanced west of Kairouan, Zuhayr accompanied him. As Uqba campaigned in the region of Sous (in modern-day Morocco), he ordered Zuhayr to return with the majority of the Arab troops to Kairouan to defend the city from an impending Byzantine attack. Uqba was subsequently slain by the Byzantine-backed Berbers led by Kasila in 682. Panic ensued among the Arab troops of Kairouan; the majority sided with Hanash al-San'ani, who advocated for withdrawal to Barqa (Cyrenaica), while Zuhayr favored resistance. The army ultimately withdrew. Meanwhile, a major political crisis gripped much of the Umayyad Caliphate with the outbreak of the Second Muslim Civil War. Zuhayr entered the service of the governor of Egypt, Ibn Jahdam, who was allied with the Umayyads' rival, the Mecca-based Caliph Abd Allah ibn al-Zubayr. He fought alongside Ibn Jahdam during an assault against the Umayyad prince and general Abd al-Aziz ibn Marwan at Ayla on Syria's Red Sea coast. The Umayyads ultimately seized Egypt and Abd al-Aziz became its governor, after which he and Zuhayr reconciled, though Abd al-Aziz remained wary of him.

=== Taking over the rule of Cyrenaica ===
He installed Zuhayr as deputy governor of Barqa with instructions to combat the resurgent Byzantines. Tensions developed between the governor and Zuhayr when the former disparaged him; Zuhayr responded that because of his role in the rescension of the Qur'an, he ought to be treated honorably. According to the historian Mohamed Talbi, Abd al-Aziz's brother, the Caliph Abd al-Malik, appointed Zuhayr to lead a campaign to defeat the Byzantine–Berber alliance and restore the Arab position in Ifriqiya. To that end, Zuhayr recaptured Kairouan and drove the Berbers west to Mams, where he slew Kasila.

=== The death ===
It is unclear when these events precisely occurred, but it was sometime prior to Zuhayr's death at the hands of Byzantine raiders in Barqa in 688. In that incident, the historian Reif Georges Khoury writes that Zuhayr "died valiantly with 70 of his companions before the rest of the troops could come to his aid".

== Bibliography ==
- Khoury, R. G. (2002). "Zuhayr b. Kays". In Bearman, P. J.; Bianquis, Th.; Bosworth, C. E.; van Donzel, E. & Heinrichs, W. P. (eds.). The Encyclopaedia of Islam, Second Edition. Volume XI: W–Z. Leiden: E. J. Brill. p. 559. ISBN 978-90-04-12756-2.
- McKenna, Amy, ed. (2011). The History of Northern Africa. Britannica Educational Publishing. ISBN 978-1-61530-397-7.
- Talbi, M. (1986). "Kusayla". In Bosworth, C. E.; van Donzel, E.; Lewis, B. & Pellat, Ch. (eds.). The Encyclopaedia of Islam, Second Edition. Volume V: Khe–Mahi. Leiden: E. J. Brill. pp. 517–518. ISBN 978-90-04-07819-2.

Preceded by Uqba ibn Nafi	Governor of Ifriqiya; 683–688	Succeeded by Hassan ibn al-Nu'man
