= Battle of Carthage (698) =

Engagement of the conquest of Maghreb

- Part of the Muslim conquest of the Maghreb (Arab–Byzantine wars)
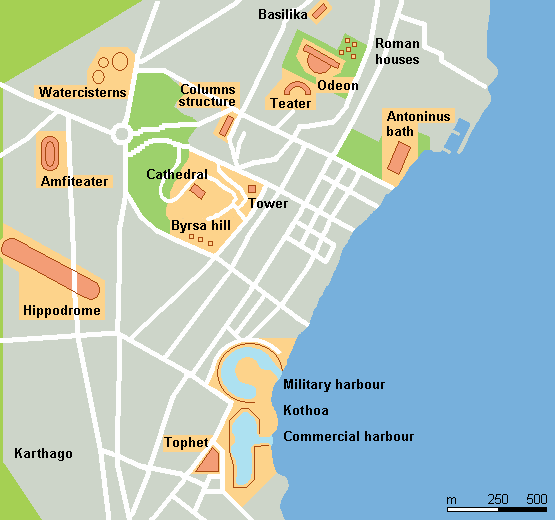
- Roman Carthage was destroyed, its walls torn down, its water supply cut off, and its harbours made unusable.
Date	698 AD
Location	Carthage, Tunisia 36°51′10.08″N 10°19′23.88″E
Result	Umayyad victory
Territorial changes	Carthage captured by the Arabs

Belligerents
Umayyad Caliphate	Byzantine Empire

Commanders and leaders
Abd al-Malik ibn Marwan; Hasan ibn al-Nu'man	Leontius; Tiberius Apsimar; John the Patrician (executed)

Strength
40,000	Unknown
- Location within Tunisia

The Battle of Carthage was fought in 698 AD between a Byzantine expeditionary force and the armies of the Umayyad Caliphate. The battle was a lynchpin of the ongoing Muslim conquest of the Maghreb and put remaining Byzantine resistance to rest.

== Background ==
During the Second Invasion of the Arab conquest of North Africa, the forces sent by the Umayyad Caliph Abd al-Malik made it deep into the Roman Province of Africa and established a military base there called Kairouan. Due to other ongoing conflicts to the North and East of the Umayyad Caliphate, these conquering forces were redeployed elsewhere. In the vacuum, Byzantine and Carthaginian forces in the region were able to push the garrison forces out and back to Cyrenaica.

Abd al-Malik responded by appointing the general Hassan ibn al-Nu'man to an army, that historians claim to be numbered at 40,000 strong, that would reconquer the lost territory and push on through the rest of Byzantine provinces. In his push back into Tripolitania, Hassan took to a divide and conquer strategy. He would deny coordination between the Carthaginians and Byzantines, who he would deal with the former first. The subduing of the Carthaginian of Tripolitania and Africa gave Hassan and his army access to the interior of the provinces, while the coast was still controlled by the Byzantines. Once Hassan recaptured Kairouan, he and his forces regrouped in the fortified town and prepared to march on Carthage.

== Preparation ==
In 697, Hassan began his foray into proper Byzantine controlled territory. To isolate Carthage in preparation for the coming siege, Hassan's forces conquered the surrounding towns and eliminated the surrounding garrisons. The Arab forces encountered little resistance and faced minimal casualties. When the Arab forces arrived at the gates of Carthage they quickly established a land siege of the city and offered terms to the inhabitants. Many wealthy Carthaginains fled and took most of the wealth of the city off to Iberia, Italy, and Greece. Once all evacuating citizens had left, the remaining population surrendered to the Arabs in order to prevent any bloodshed.

Emperor Leontius, only in the third year of his reign, soon learnt of the events that befell Africa and undertook a mobilisation effort. Tasked to the reclaiming of the province was the general John the Patrician. He was given a contingent of soldiers from Sicily, veteran Goth warriors, and the Karabisianoi Theme Navy and they immediately began their excursion that fall. Hassan figured as long as he chained the Cothon of Carthage, the city would be safe from any Byzantine reprisals. Presuming his position secure, Hassan took the majority of his forces to continue the conquest and went to fight the Berbers tribes to the West.

== Battle ==
In a surprise attack on the city, John the Patrician's force burst through the chains blocking the Great Carthaginian Cothon. They were able to do this as a result of John ordering the larger ships with reinforced hulls to lead the charge through the chain. Once in the harbour, the Byzantine forces disembarked and made quick work of the Arab garrison and retook the city. The Arab garrison was forced to flee back to Kairouan. Taking advantage of their momentum, John sent forces out to retake surrounding small towns to ensure better access of supplies to Carthage. After a fight with a Moorish tribe, Hassan was finally informed of the Byzantine breakthrough. He quickly reorganized his army and hastily marched them to Carthage. Anticipating an upcoming struggle, both generals quickly wrote back to their capitals requesting aid and reinforcements. Despite Constantinople being closer than Damascus, the Byzantines were not able to respond quickly enough to the letter. Due to Byzantine bureaucratic dawdling, the Umayyads were able to send an entire fresh army to Hassan before John's reinforcements even left the port of Constantinople.

Prior to his reinforcements arriving, Hassan began his second siege of Carthage. Throughout the siege, the Byzantines sallied out a few times but each attack was beaten back. Hassan soon became enraged with the situation and decided that when he eventually took the city he would raze it to the ground. As soon as the additional army arrived, John surmised he was too outnumbered to wait for his reinforcements and it was time to abandon the city. The Byzantine forces held the wall only as long as was needed to man all the ships and hastily embark. Meanwhile, Hassan began heavy attacks on the Carthaginian walls and as soon as the Byzantines left, his forces took the walls and opened the gates for him. John took part in one more battle in the neighbouring town of Utica. However this also proved to be too much for the Byzantine force and they quickly reembarked just as they were about to be overtaken by Hassan's forces.

== Aftermath ==
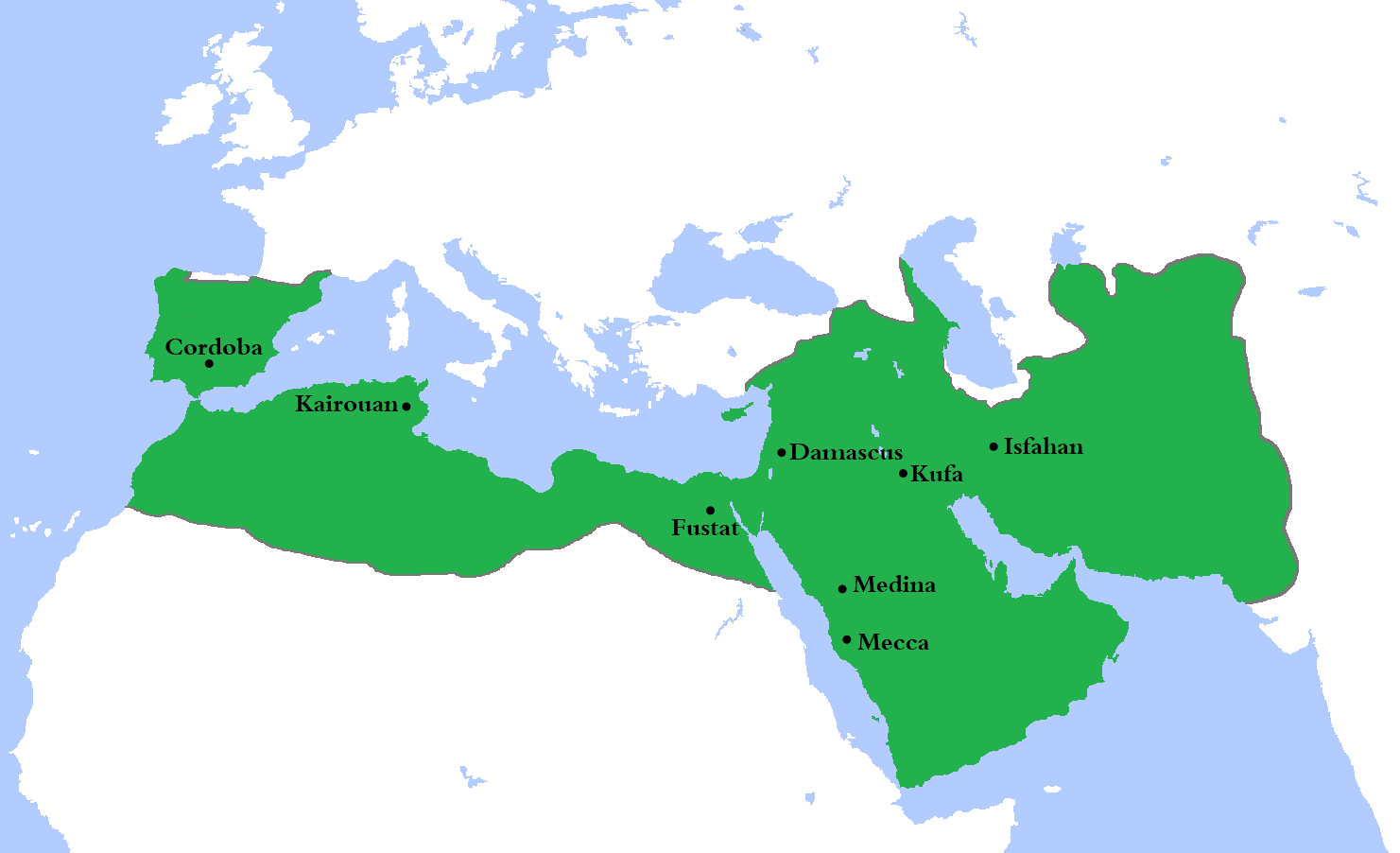
The Umayyad Caliphate at its height in 732AD

Just as Hassan had committed himself to doing, he destroyed Carthage and eliminated the possibility of the Byzantines from claiming a strong defensible city if they ever invaded with another larger army. The consequences of this battle were immense. This would mark the final end of Roman control and influence over Carthage, and subsequently all of North Africa.

Hassan, now free of the largest threat to his invasion turned his sights West and aimed to bring the remainder of former Roman North Africa under the yoke of the Umayyad Caliphate. Hassan had to deal with 5 years worth of insurrection in what was Numidia before he could reach the Atlantic Coast of Africa. Wishing to not have a change in overlord, the Jewish queen Kahina led what could today be described as a fierce guerilla war against the Arab forces. However, the Jews could not stop the growing Arab power and ultimately fell to their strength. In 709 A.D., Hassan completed his conquest of North Africa and returned to the Levant a legend.

For the Byzantines, the tragic loss of one of the great cities of the Roman Empire set a series of crises in motion. After the loss at Utica, John took his forces to reorganise in Crete before returning to Constantinople. From there he planned to set out to see the Emperor Leontius and tell him the events of the campaign. Fearing reprisals from the emperor for their failure and considering they would have a better reception if one of their own took over, the Theme army mutinied against John, hailed one of the other high-ranking officers, Apsimar, emperor and set out to take Constantinople. Apsimar would be the third emperor to be hailed in the Crisis of the Twenty Years' Anarchy.
