= Hassan ibn al-Nu'man =

Umayyad general (died 705)

Hassan ibn al-Nu'man al-Ghassani حسان بن النعمان الغساني

Governor of Ifriqiya
- In office 688–703
- Monarch: Abd al-Malik ibn Marwan
- Preceded by: Zuhayr ibn Qays
- Succeeded by: Musa ibn Nusayr

Personal details
- Died: 700s
- Religion: Islam

Military service
- Allegiance: Umayyad Caliphate
- Branch/service: Umayyad Army
- Battles/wars: Muslim conquest of the Maghreb; Battle of Meskiana; Battle of Carthage; Battle of Tabarka

Hassan ibn al-Nu'man al-Ghassani (Arabic: حسان بن النعمان الغساني, romanized: Hassān ibn al-Nuʿmān al-Ghassānī) was an Arab general of the Umayyad Caliphate who led the final Muslim conquest of Ifriqiya, firmly establishing Islamic rule in the region. Appointed by Caliph Abd al-Malik (r. 685–705), Hassan launched a series of campaigns during the closing years of the 7th century, during which he defeated the Byzantines and the Berbers led by al-Kahina. The Byzantine capital of Carthage was destroyed in 698 and the nearby city of Tunis was founded in the following year. In Kairouan, Hassan set up a Muslim administration for the province to collect taxes from its Christian inhabitants and pay the troops. He enrolled thousands of Berbers into the army, which proved critical to later Muslim military successes in the Maghreb and the Iberian Peninsula. He was ultimately ousted from his post by the governor of Egypt, Abd al-Aziz ibn Marwan, due to a power struggle for influence over Ifriqiya.

== Origins ==
Hassan ibn al-Nu'man hailed from the Ghassanid tribe, which militarily led the Arab tribal confederates of the Byzantine Empire in Syria in the century preceding the Muslim conquest of the region in the 630s. Part of the tribe remained Christian following the conquest and migrated to the remaining territories of the Byzantine Empire, but some tribesmen remained in Syria and formed part of the Syrian army, the core of the Umayyad military.

== Reconquest of North Africa ==
=== First campaign ===
Hassan was appointed by the Umayyad caliph Abd al-Malik to lead the Arab reconquest of Ifriqiya (modern-day Tunisia) in North Africa. The chronology of Hassan's campaign and those of his immediate predecessors is uncertain as a result of the different dates provided by the medieval sources. The historian Mohamed Talbi asserts that the accounts of the two earliest sources, Ibn Abd al-Hakam (d. 871) and Ibn Qutayba (d. 889), confirmed by Ibn Asakir (d. 1175), are the "most probable ... agrees with the logical sequence of events and makes it possible to avoid inconsistencies". Prior to Hassan's appointment, Ifriqiya had fallen to the Berbers under Kasila and the Byzantines at the Battle of Vescera in 682. An initially successful attempt by Zuhayr ibn Qays al-Balawi to reconquer the region ultimately ended with Zuhayr's slaying and the Byzantines' capture of Barce in Cyrenaica in c. 688. Abd al-Malik, having consolidated his control over the Caliphate in the Second Muslim Civil War and resumed hostilities with Byzantium in 692, had troops to spare and equipped Hassan with 40,000 men. The deployment of an Arab force of this size to North Africa was unprecedented.

Marching along the North African coast, Hassan likely entered Ifriqiya in 692/93, 693/94, or 695. He first captured and plundered the port city of Carthage, the Byzantines' fortified capital in the province. Carthage had retained its Byzantine garrison and population through the first Muslim conquest of Ifriqiya in 670, but had long lost its former power and prosperity by the time Hassan entered the city. Nonetheless, it was still deemed a threat by the Arab general, as demonstrated by its fleet's attack on Cyrenaica in 688. The city was apparently deserted before the Arabs' entry, its inhabitants having fled to Sicily, and there is neither an account of a siege or serious resistance nor any details about the captured spoils. Hassan continued northward and defeated the Byzantines and the Berbers at Bizerte. Afterward, the Byzantines withdrew and reinforced their position in Vaga (modern Béja), while the Berbers fled eastward to Bône (modern Annaba).

In 697, the Byzantine emperor Leontios (r. 695–698) dispatched a strong fleet, which retook Carthage, which resulted in the city's Arab forces fleeing to Kairouan, which had been established by the Arabs in 670 as their capital in Ifriqiya. In 698, Hassan forces recaptured Carthage, which was destroyed, its walls torn down, its water supply cut off, and its harbors made unusable. Afterwards, Hassan moved against the Berbers led by their warrior queen, al-Kahina. Though information about her is difficult to disentangle from legend, it is apparent that she ruled the Aurès, a rugged massif a few days' distance from Arab possessions in Ifriqiya and strategically located between Ifriqiya and the western half of North Africa (the Maghreb, i.e. modern-day Algeria and Morocco). According to the 13th-century historian Ibn Idhari, who provides the fullest known account of al-Kahina, Hassan, upon entering Kairouan, inquired about the strongest king left in Ifriqiya and was informed that al-Kahina commanded the loyalty of the Berber tribes and if she should be eliminated, the Maghreb would fall to Hassan. Skipping over the Byzantine fortress of Baghaya (al-Majjana), which al-Kahina had preemptively captured and destroyed to prevent its utilization by the Arabs, Hassan met the Berbers at the Battle of Meskiana. There, he was dealt a heavy blow by al-Kahina, forcing him to retreat first to the vicinity of Gabes before evacuating Ifriqiya altogether. Many of his troops were killed or captured by the Berbers as they fled. He stopped at an area containing several forts, later collectively called "Qusur Hassan" after him, about four-days march to the east of Tripoli.

=== Second campaign ===
Hassan requested reinforcements from Abd al-Malik and informed him of the Berbers' indefatigability and seeming anarchism. He was ordered by the caliph to hold his position, and Hassan remained in Tripolitania for about three to five year. Meanwhile, al-Kahina, according to Ibn Idhari, engaged in a massive scorched earth campaign against the cities and orchards of the Maghreb "from Tripoli to Tangier", leading to a mass flight of the affected areas' inhabitants to the Iberian Peninsula and various Mediterranean islands. By attacking the Maghreb's civilized wealth, i.e. potential war booty for the Arabs, her aim was to disinterest the Arabs from future invasions of the region, while not disturbing the Berbers' agricultural and pastoral livelihood. Though Ibn Idhari's account reduces the centuries-long process of the Maghreb's "environmental and urban degradation" to the span of a few years, the historian Hugh N. Kennedy points out that it nonetheless offers a clue about the region's urban and agricultural decline in the 6th–7th centuries, but here the Arabs are portrayed as the "preservers of urban life and civilization", not its "destroyers" as they are often depicted in modern sources.

Hassan ultimately received more troops from the caliph and gained the defections of some 12,000 Berbers disillusioned by al-Kahina's policies. With this new army, he recommenced his campaign most likely by 701, 702 or 703, scoring a victory against al-Kahina at Gabes, before pursuing her into the Aures, where he defeated and killed her near the modern-day town of Tobna. There is scant information about the battle except that al-Kahina portended her defeat and sent away her sons to be protected by the Arab troops. Hassan then turned his attention to Byzantine-held Carthage; upon his approach, the city was abandoned and he ordered its destruction in 698 to prevent future reuse by the Byzantine navy.

== Administration of Ifriqiya ==
Along the lines of the Umayyads' centralization efforts elsewhere in the Caliphate, Hassan attempted establishing an efficient administration for Ifriqiya from Kairouan. To that end, he inaugurated a central diwan (government agency) to register and pay the troops and collect the kharaj (poll tax) from local Christians. To ensure the loyalty and collaboration of the new Berber Muslim converts, he enrolled them in the diwan and offered them a stake in the distribution of income-producing lands. Hassan is also credited with restoring with stronger building material the Great Mosque of Kairouan, founded by Ifriqiya's first Arab conqueror, Uqba ibn Nafi.

Further inland of Carthage, Hassan founded the medina of Tunis in March 699, at the outskirts of an ancient site and the base of a lake by the same name. On Abd al-Malik's orders, he set about establishing an arsenal in the new city, employing 1,000 Coptic laborers from Egypt to build warships. The caliph's intention was to establish a strong fleet to effectively combat the Byzantines by land and sea. As part of these efforts, Hassan connected the city with the Gulf of Tunis by digging a canal through the strip of water at the Halq al-Wadi, which separates the lagoon from the gulf, to afford the new ships direct access to the Mediterranean.

== Dismissal and legacy ==
Hassan became the target of a struggle by the governor of Egypt, the caliph's brother, Abd al-Aziz ibn Marwan, to assert Egypt's control over the Arab territories of North Africa. He sought to appoint his own loyalist, Musa ibn Nusayr, to Ifriqiya, and thus effected Hassan's dismissal from the post in 704. Though Hassan had restored the Arab position in the province and expelled the Byzantines, Berber tribes still controlled the mountainous region approximately west of the modern-day Algeria-Tunisia border and could potentially threaten Arab gains to the east—a state of affairs Musa was resolved to end. On Hassan's way to the caliph's court in Damascus, he was stopped in Egypt, where Abd al-Aziz confiscated all of his spoils from Ifriqiya, including those destined for the caliph.

The military offensive Hassan commanded was the "final consolidation of the Arab conquest" of Ifriqiya, according to Talbi. In Kennedy's assessment, Hassan "prove[d] an able general and reliable administrator and was, in many ways, the real founder of Muslim North Africa". His military achievements and administrative reforms also inaugurated a permanent Muslim government in Ifriqiya and set the stage for the increasing conversion of Berbers to Islam and recruitment into the Muslim army; their incorporation proved to be crucial in the Muslim conquest of the Iberian Peninsula during the reign of Caliph al-Walid I (r. 705–715)

== Bibliography ==
- Kennedy, Hugh (2007). The Great Arab Conquests: How the Spread of Islam Changed the World We Live In. Philadelphia, Pennsylvania: Da Capo Press. ISBN 978-0-306-81740-3.
- Modéran, Yves (2005). "Kahena". Encyclopédie Berbère. Vol. 27. pp. 4102–4111.
- Sebag, P. (2000). "Tunis". In Bearman, P. J.; Bianquis, Th.; Bosworth, C. E.; van Donzel, E. & Heinrichs, W. P. (eds.). The Encyclopaedia of Islam, Second Edition. Volume X: T–U. Leiden: E. J. Brill. pp. 629–639. ISBN 978-90-04-11211-7.
- Talbi, M. (1971). "Ḥassān b. al-Nuʿmān al-Ghassānī". In Lewis, B.; Ménage, V. L.; Pellat, Ch. & Schacht, J. (eds.). The Encyclopaedia of Islam, Second Edition. Volume III: H–Iram. Leiden: E. J. Brill. p. 271. OCLC 495469525.

Preceded by Zuhayr ibn Qays al-Balawi	Governor of Ifriqiya; 688–703	Succeeded by Musa ibn Nusayr
