= Tubna =

Tubna or Tibna (Arabic: تبنة) (Note: alternative transliterations include Tibne, Tobne, Tobna, Tebneh, Tibneh or Tubbanah and others) refer to the following places in the Middle East and North Africa:

- Tobna, a former city in Algeria
- Tubna, Syria, a village in southern Syria
- Tibna, Jordan, a village in northwestern Jordan
- Khirbet Tibnah, an archaeological site in central Palestine.
- Timnah (referred to as 'Khirbet Tibneh' in Arabic), an ancient site in central Israel.
