= Byzantine North Africa =

Historical period (6th-8th c.)

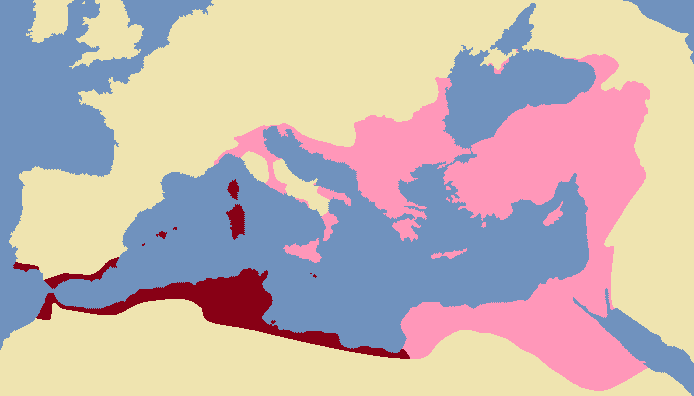
Byzantine Africa around 600

Byzantine rule in North Africa spanned around 175 years. It began in the years 533/534 with the reconquest of territory formerly belonging to the Western Roman Empire by the Eastern Roman (Byzantine) Empire under Justinian I and ended during the reign of Justinian II with the conquest of Carthage (698) and the last Byzantine outposts, especially Septem (708/711), in the course of Islamic expansion.

The region's administrative structure was initially in line with the typical late Roman administrative structures that had been existing for the past 300 years. Civil powers were thus in the hands of a Praetorian prefect, the head of the supreme civil administrative authority in the Late Roman Empire. The military powers, however, were incumbent on a Magister militum per Africam. These powers were merged into a single office from 591 at the latest, and East Roman North Africa became the heartland of one of two exarchates, with the founding of which the East Roman Emperor Maurice (582–602) was able to counteract the consequences of imperial overstretch through bundling and decentralization. No further change in these administrative structures took place until the end of Byzantine rule.

The reconquest of this region was of the greatest strategic and economic significance and the most enduring of all conquests in the West. While the Lombard kingdom was established in parts of East Roman Italy after 568 and East Roman rule in southern Spain came to an end amidst the final and most desperate Roman-Persian war, the areas reconquered in the Maghreb remained entirely in the East Roman hands until the Arab conquest of North Africa. This made the region the most important cornerstone of Eastern Roman/Byzantine power in the West.

== Initial situation ==
The rapid establishment of Eastern Roman rule in today's Maghreb was the result of the increasing political vacuum in the African provinces of the former Western Empire and the Germanic successor state of the Vandals, which was primarily characterized by the dissolution of regional power and administrative structures.

=== Former Western Roman North Africa at the close of the 5th and beginning of the 6th century. ===
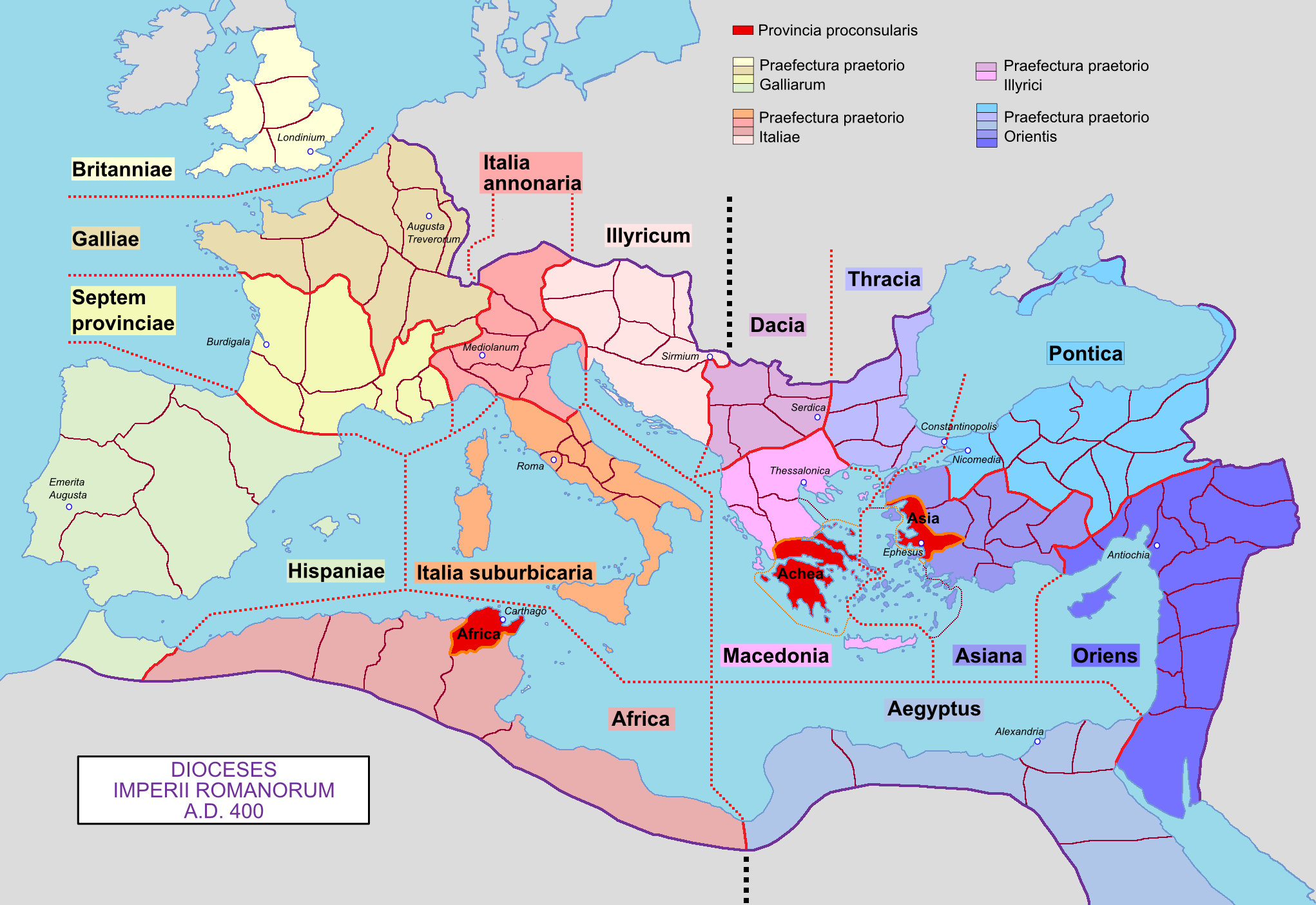
Addministrative structure of the Imperium Romanum after 395

With the partition of the empire in 395, all Roman areas in Africa west of the Great Syrte became part of the Western Roman Empire. Specifically, these were the provinces of Tripolitania, Byzacena, Zeugitana (also called Proconsularis provincia or Africa proconsularis), Numidia, Mauretania Sitifensis, Mauretania Caesariensis and Mauretania Tingitana. These provinces could be considered, at least in part, to be the heart of the western empire, since they supplied Italy with grain and generated a large part of the western empire's tax revenues. From 429 they were caught up in the political turmoil of the migration of peoples by the Vandals crossing at Septem. After the assassination of Emperor Valentinian III in 455 at the latest, no region in Africa was under Western Roman rule.

==== Vandal rule ====
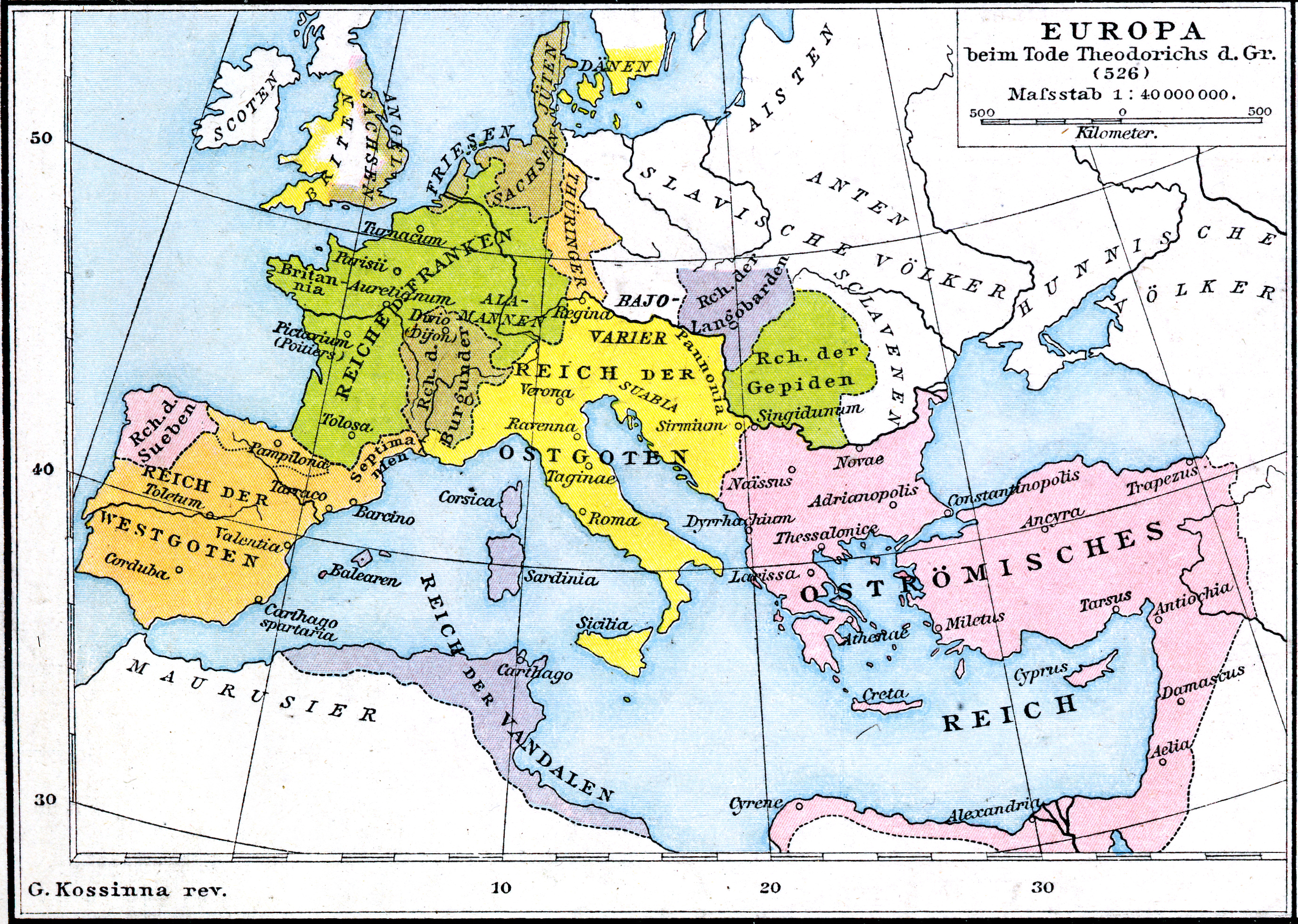
The Vandal kingdom a few years before the East Roman conquest, weakened by secessions and Moorish attacks.

In parts of western Roman North Africa in 439, with the conquest of Carthage by the Vandals under their king Geiseric, a de facto independent empire ruled by predominantly Germanic warriors had been established. This Vandal Kingdom dominated the western Mediterranean region with its powerful fleet and brought Corsica and Sardinia, the Balearic Islands and the western tip of Sicily under his control. This was extremely consequential for Western Rome, as Africa was a rich and heavily urbanized province; in addition to olive production, the function of the province as a granary for Western Rome, especially Italy, was of central importance.

In 441 an Eastern Roman attempt to defeat the Vandal fleet and end their rule failed. Rather, the Western Roman Empire had to recognize the Vandal rule east of Numidia in a treaty in 442. In 468, the kingdom of the Vandals became the target of another, this time large-scale, joint venture between the Western Empire under Anthemius and the Eastern Roman Empire under Leo I. However, this Vandal campaign failed catastrophically, mainly because the Vandal king Geiseric succeeded in setting fire to the large Roman fleet. After Vandal raids along the coast of eastern Roman Illyricum (and possibly the failure of another, smaller Roman campaign in 470), the eastern Roman emperor Zeno guaranteed the Geiseric family in a treaty (foedus) in 475 ownership of the province of Africa and the islands; subsequently there were no more conflicts between the Vandal Kingdom and the Eastern Roman Empire for decades.

In the 94 years of its existence, the kingdom of the Vandals was characterized by dynastic disputes over dominance and, above all, by the contrast between the Nicene Roman population and the Vandals, who were Romanized but adhered to the Arian faith of Christianity. In addition, they had considerable difficulties in defending the national borders against the Berbers or in keeping the Berbers under Vandal rule under control. This situation prompted large landowners and smallholders alike to fortify their farms. However, contrary to older opinions, the time of the Vandal Kingdom was not an era of serious economic decline, rather trade relations continued, although probably limited by the independence of the Vandal Kingdom and its aggressive foreign policy, especially under Geiseric.

==== Roman-Berber areas ====
In the years following 439, Numidia and the provinces of ancient Mauritania initially remained under Western Roman rule . Here, the Western Roman Emperor Valentinian III approved the raising of private armies by large landowners because he hoped that this would lead to attacks on Vandal territory. After the assassination of Valentinian III, this warlord-like status of large landowners prompted the disintegration of these provinces into various small empires, which were perceived as Berber in the public of the rest of the Mediterranean area and especially in the region around Carthage. Numidia and the coastal areas of the Mauritanian provinces were immediately conquered by the Vandals, but after the death of the Vandal king Huneric in 484, some seceded from the Vandal Kingdom. Roman-Berber areas persisted throughout the Mauritanian provinces, above all a Regnum Maurorum et Romanorum with the capital Altava, whose importance continued to increase until the 570s. The exclusively Berber character of these areas, which were predominantly not under Vandal rule and were formerly Western Roman, has now been completely refuted. In particular, the regions around Altava as well as Lixus and Volubilis in the extremely western Mauretania Tingitana showed continued existence of the old trade connections and Latin grave inscriptions, in some cases up to the year 655. In addition, the petty kingdoms of this region welcomed many Romans who were persecuted by the Vandals for religious and other reasons.

=== End of the Vandal Kingdom ===
Campaigning during the Vandal war.

In its final years, the Vandal Kingdom was ringed with hostile Romano-Berber petty kingdoms and was under constant attacks from them. Under the penultimate Vandal king, Hilderic, who was intent on reaching a settlement with the East and turning away from Arianism, the foreign and domestic political difficulties of his empire increased considerably, with a Vandal defeat against the Berbers leading to his fall at the hands of Gelimer in 530. The last Vandal king Gelimer, on the other hand, not only saw himself confronted with the threat from the Berbers after the coup d'etat, but also had to send part of his army and fleet to Sardinia to put down an uprising by the noble Godas there, and at the same time he had to face another uprising of the Tripolitan governor Prudentius initially watched idly.

Under these conditions, the Eastern Roman Emperor Justinian I began the Vandal War in 533, which also enabled him to divert attention from the after-effects of the Nika riots of the previous year. He sent an army led by Belisarius and 15,000 infantry and cavalry to Carthage and a smaller army to support Prudentius in Tripolitania. These troops were able to conquer most of the Vandals' domain within nine months – a circumstance that was possibly additionally favored by the fact that some Roman-Berber petty empires saw a reason for war in the fall of Hilderich in a similar way as the Eastern Roman emperor did.

== Religion ==
=== Christian beliefs ===
Christianity spread in the area of today's Maghreb during the Roman period from the 3rd century and was the dominant religion in late antiquity and probably also in the early Middle Ages. Up to three Christian faiths were represented here, which disappeared at the latest through Islamization from the beginning of the 8th century.

==== Roman Imperial (Nicene-Chalcedonian) Church ====
The majority of Christians in the Maghreb consisted consistently of Latino-Nicene Christians, who thus belonged to the faith that was the state religion of the Roman Empire. The Vandal rule with the associated suppression of the Latin-Nicene faith also had an effect in the Eastern Roman period. On the one hand, state control and the direct influence of the pope were absent for around a century. This required and established a certain degree of autonomy from local church dignitaries and religious scholars, who did not want to give them back to the Eastern Roman Emperor. The region in particular was more open to religious debates than other provinces of the Roman Empire. On the other hand, the Latino-Nicene Christian communities in the Maghreb had developed an aversion to any deviation from the ecumenical councils. As far as Byzantine emperors tried to reach an agreement with oriental faiths through compromises such as the three-chapter dispute or monotheletism, this was rejected in the Maghreb much in the same way as in Italy and thus burdened the cohesion of the empire. Together with the considerably more significant spatial expansion, population and economic power compared to the Italian possessions of the Byzantine Empire and the resulting lower dependence of the Byzantine Maghreb, this even led to secession. The Greek monk Maximus Confessor, who stayed in the Maghreb between 628 and 645 and became the mouthpiece of the African church, played a special role here and perceived the new doctrine as an unthinkable compromise with the Monophysites and condemned monotheletism in a Lateran synod headed by Pope Martin I.

==== Other denominations ====
In the Maghreb, as early as the last phase of the persecution of Christians in the Roman Empire, Donatism (named after Donatus Magnus, 315 to 355 primate of the Donatists) split off from the Western Church in the 4th and 5th centuries. This split, which had developed its own ecclesiology, remained limited to north-west Africa. The Donatist communities were the dominant faith in Mauretania Sitifensis and Numidia until the western Roman persecution from 411 onwards, were on par with the Latin-Nicene communities in the western regions of the Mauritanian provinces and in Tripolitania, whereas they were a strong minority in the Byzacena and represented in all other parts of Africa, whereby they seem to have been particularly widespread among the Berbers. The Donatists were also suppressed under the Vandals as well as under the Eastern Romans. During the Byzantine era, their trace disappeared. The extent to which Donatists were also persecuted in the Roman-Berber petty kingdoms has not been researched, but given the evidence of religious tolerance at the time of the Vandals and the lack of any information on suppression afterwards, persecution can probably be denied.

The conquest by the Arian Vandals was accompanied by the arrival of Arianism as the third Christian faith in the Maghreb, which, as the state religion of the Vandal Kingdom, stood in contrast to the Nicene creed of the emperors of both Roman halves, but also of the majority of the population in the Maghreb. Clergymen were exiled, monasteries dissolved and believers of the Nicene Confession put under pressure. However, the persecution by the Vandals met resistance from Catholic Christians as well as Donatists and ended with the Eastern Roman reconquest. From then on, the Arians were also an oppressed minority.

From then until the conquest by the Arabs, there were parallel Latin-Nicene, Greek(Byzantine)-Nicene and Homoean-non-Nicene (Arian) and probably also Donatist Christians in North Africa and Sardinia.

=== Judaism ===
It is unclear when the first Jewish communities in the Maghreb came into being, because Jewish traders may have settled there when the Phoenicians, who were also Semitic, established trading posts. At the latest since the Hadrianic founding of the city of Aelia Capitolina and the province of Palaestina, the Jews finally dispersed as a regionally tangible and cohesive people. Migrating into their diaspora, Jews also settled in the Roman Maghreb. Since Berbers subsequently converted to Judaism, it is already unclear for the pre-Islamic period to what extent the Maghreb Jews were of Berber or Israelite descent. In particular, the legend arose that the confederacy of Kāhina was Jewish. In contrast, the existence of a Judeo-Berber language is certain.

Similar to Donatists and Arians – the latter after the conquest of the Vandal Kingdom by the Eastern Romans, the Jews were also subjected to oppression, especially with regard to the ban on practicing religion, which experienced a first climax under Justinian I and in 632 under Heraclius with an edict for forced conversion across the empire also affected Byzantine North Africa. It is possible that before this Christianization policy, Jews had moved to the parts of Mauretania Tingitana that were not under Byzantine rule. In more recent research, however, it is pointed out that the concrete implementation of the edict throughout the empire is very questionable and the background to the measure was probably of an eschatological nature; it was hoped that this would stabilize the state at a time of religious unrest. Ultimately, however, the imperial strategy failed, and Judaism in the Maghreb remained strong

== Praetorian prefecture of Africa 533–590 ==
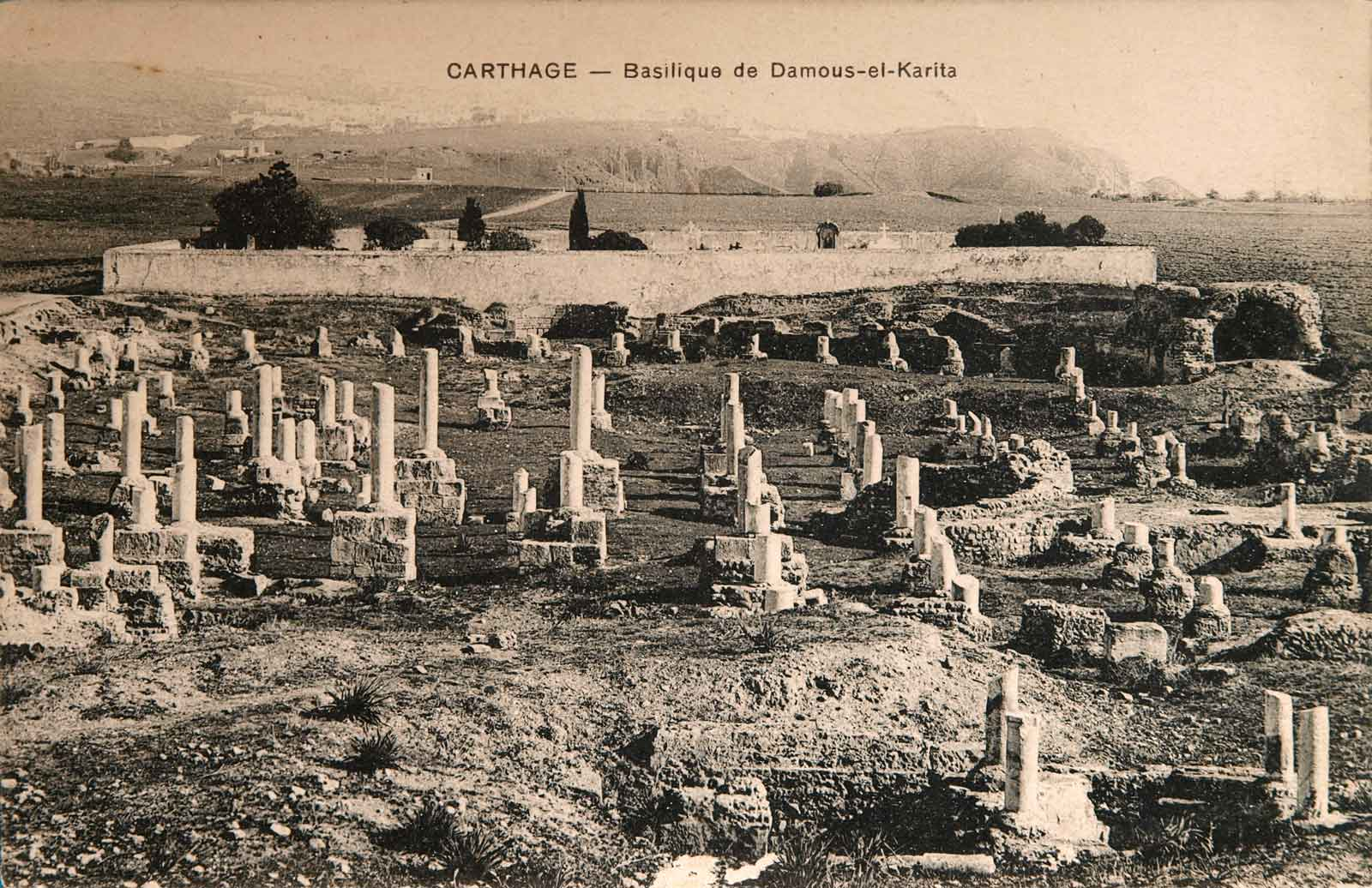
Remains of the Basilica of Damous El Karita in Carthage, a church that experienced a substantial expansion during the 6th century. Approximately 14.000 fragments of inscriptions were found during the discovery of the church some time between 1876 and 1892.

After Belisarius had annihilated the Vandal Kingdom with his unexpectedly quick victories over Gelimer at the Battle of Ad Decimum and the Battle of Tricamarum, its territories – and thus the economically strongest province of the former Western Roman Empire – became re-incorporated into the Roman Empire without major war-related destruction.

Justinian restored the old administrative division, but raised the overall governor at Carthage to the supreme administrative rank of Praetorian Prefect, thereby ending the Diocese of Africa's traditional subordination to the Prefecture of Italy (then still under the rule of the Ostrogothic Kingdom). Seven provinces – four consular, three praesides – were designated:

From the aforesaid city, with the aid of God, seven provinces with their judges shall be controlled, of which Tingi, Carthage, Byzacium, and Tripoli, formerly under the jurisdiction of proconsuls, shall have consular rulers; while the others, that is to say, Numidia, Mauritania, and Sardinia shall, with the aid of God, be subject to governors.

— Codex Iustinianus, I.XXVII

Justinian now intended to reconquer the other regions that had been under Roman rule before the Vandals invaded and Roman-Berber petty kingdoms were established. The remaining areas of the defunct Western Roman Empire in modern-day Tunisia, Libya, Algeria, and Morocco, which never or not anymore were under Vandal rule, were already so accustomed to their own autonomy that they did not want to recognize the restored Roman rule in Carthage. Nevertheless, the Eastern Roman dominion was consolidated on African soil and extended beyond the borders of the former Vandal Kingdom, although in particular 534 to 548 exhausting battles went hand in hand with it.

Wars, religious unrest and flight are discussed in contemporary historiography, but much less attention is paid to the fact that the reconquest made all the markets of the Eastern Roman Empire and later also Italy accessible again for the products of Africa. In addition, intensive trade relations with the Frankish Empire are proven by corresponding coin finds. In addition, the turbulent times, in particular revolts by Berbers belonging to the empire or invasions by foreign Berbers, did not lead to coin hoarding to the same extent as was the case on the Balkan Peninsula in the comparable period. In addition, dramatic statements in the sources are limited to individual periods of the approximately 170-year epoch, of which a significant period of crises falls in the early period of the Praetorian Prefecture of Africa.

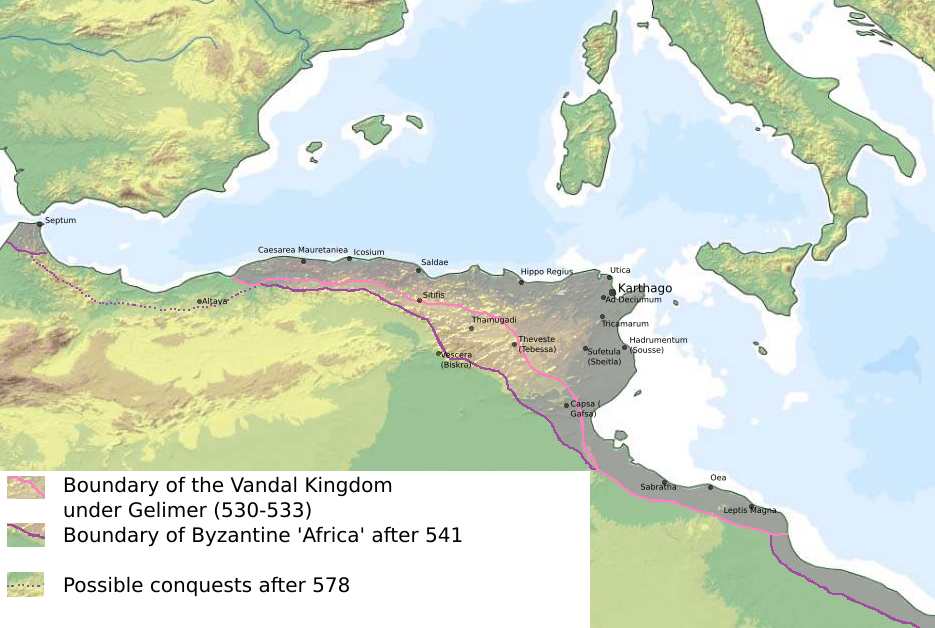
East Roman/Byzantine North Africa compared to the Vandal kingdom in the latter's final years.

At this point in time, like the other provinces of the Eastern Roman Empire, Africa was organized as a praetorian prefecture and initially included the areas that had previously remained in Vandal hands:

- Africa proconsularis (Zeugitana);
- most Byzacena;
- the western half of Tripolitania;
- Corsica and Sardinia as well as
- the coastal strips of the provinces of Mauretania Sitifensis and Numidia and
- the eastern coastal strip of the Mauretania Caesariensis.

Subsequently, the following regions were recaptured:

- the northern tip of the Mauretania Tingitana facing Spain;
- Inland areas of the provinces of Mauretania Caesariensis, Mauretania Sitifensis and Numidia;
- the parts of Byzacena bordering on the Chott el Djerid;
- the eastern half of Tripolitania bordering on Cyrenaica – at the same time land connection to Egypt and possibly
- the western coastal strip of Mauretania Caesariensis and the adjoining eastern coastal strip of Mauretania Tingitana.

For a time, southern Spain and the Balearic Islands were also included.

=== Consolidation of Eastern Roman rule ===
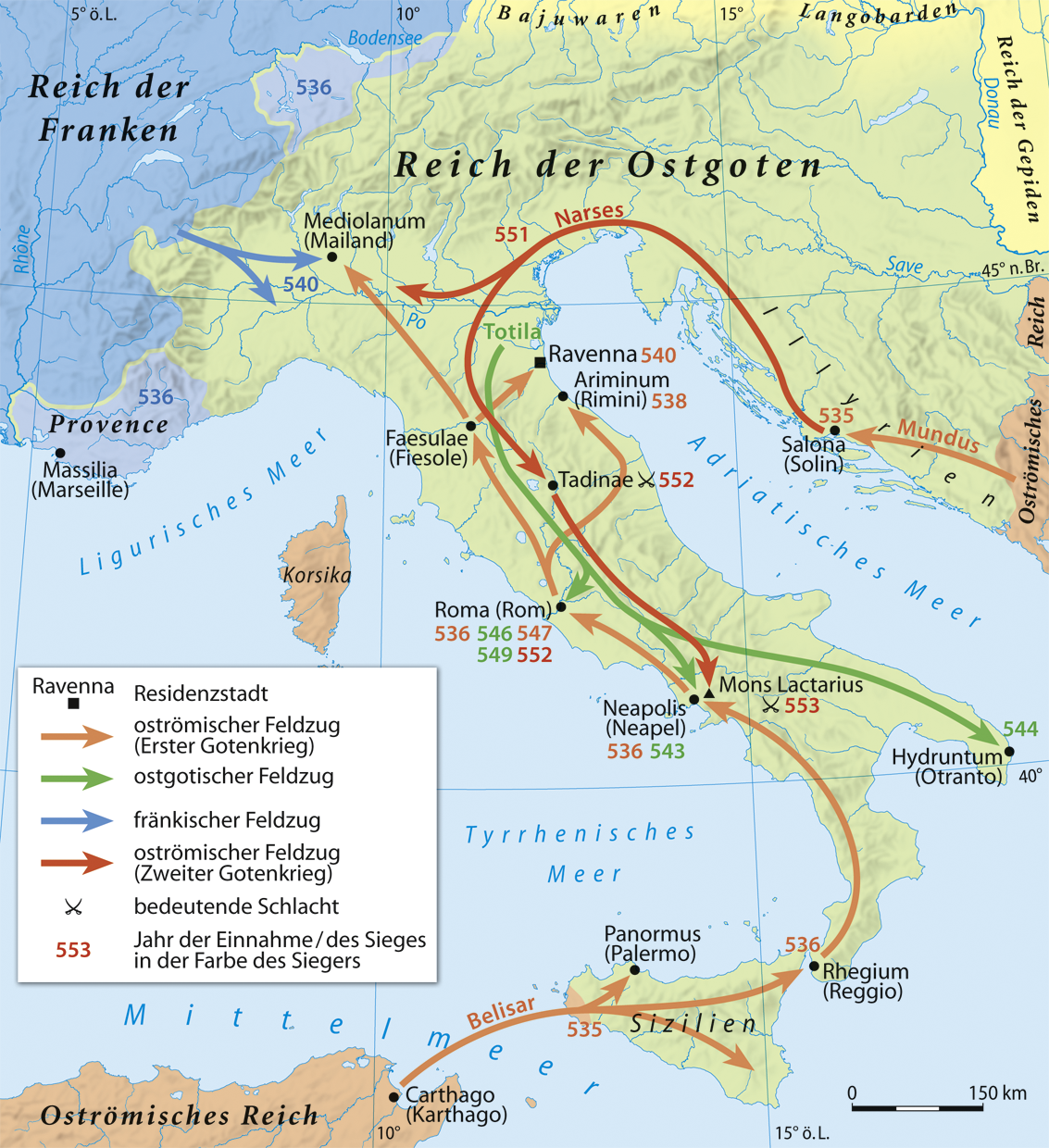
East Roman/Byzantine North Africa as a base of operations during the Gothic wars.

Shortly after Belisarius' victory, Carthage once again became the capital of the newly founded Praetorian Prefecture of Africa. Belisarius used the region he conquered in 535 as a base to attack Gothic Sicily, which began the Gothic War (535–554). Many Vandals were resettled east and used as soldiers there. The Berbers, on the other hand, who had been won over by Belisarius as allies, did not see the empire as an ally, according to their traditions, but Belisarius as a person, which is why they immediately attacked the remaining East Roman troops after Belisarius left Africa, for example in the Battle of Mammes in 534 and the Battle of Bourgaon in 535.

For their part, the formerly Vandal provinces not only had to be secured against the Berbers and – insofar as they were overrun by them during the Vandal War – conquered, but were also initially the scene of uprisings by the remaining Vandals. Some of these joined forces with dissatisfied East Roman soldiers under Stotzas, who probably made up up to two-thirds of the East Roman garrison in Africa. The reason for this was, on the one hand, Justinian I's agenda to restore the detailed status quo ante in Africa. This included a law from April 534 that gave the descendants of dispossessed Roman landowners the right to claim restitution from the Vandals within five years. In addition, because of this law, many Eastern Roman soldiers were encouraged by their Vandal wives to settle in the Vandal domiciles instead of fighting the Berbers. With a religious law that came into force on April 1, 535, Justinian decreed the return of all Arian church property to the Chalcedonian Church and prohibited Arians, Jews and Donatists from practicing religion and holding public offices, although a council convened in Carthage in 535 dealt with the questions of the reincorporation of apostate clergy and the recognition of the baptisms they performed.

By starting a fortress building program, the praetorian prefect Solomon created the conditions for the Eastern Roman rule to be consolidated despite the internal and external unrest. This alone was not enough to overcome the resistance sparked by Emperor Justinian I's religious and domestic policies; Rather, Carthage of all places was plundered in 535/536 by its own mutinous garrison.

A certain consolidation started especially from the end of 536 through the appointment of Germanus as magister militum, who ended the revolt of Stotza in 537 and then successfully reorganized the administration.

=== Reconquest of Septem and inland areas ===
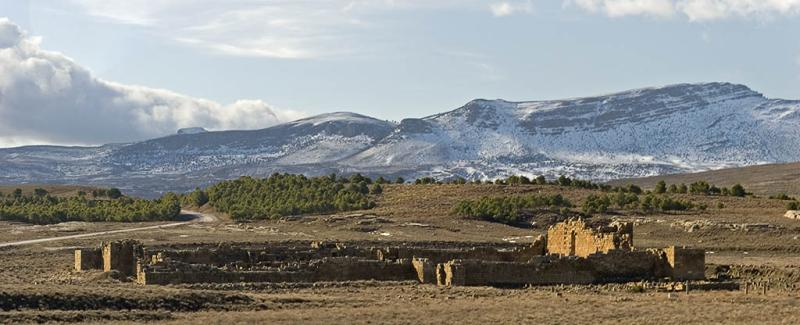
Ruins of the Byzantine fort of Thamugadi close to the Belezma ridge, western foothills of the Aures-range, an area conquered by the Byzantines after 539.

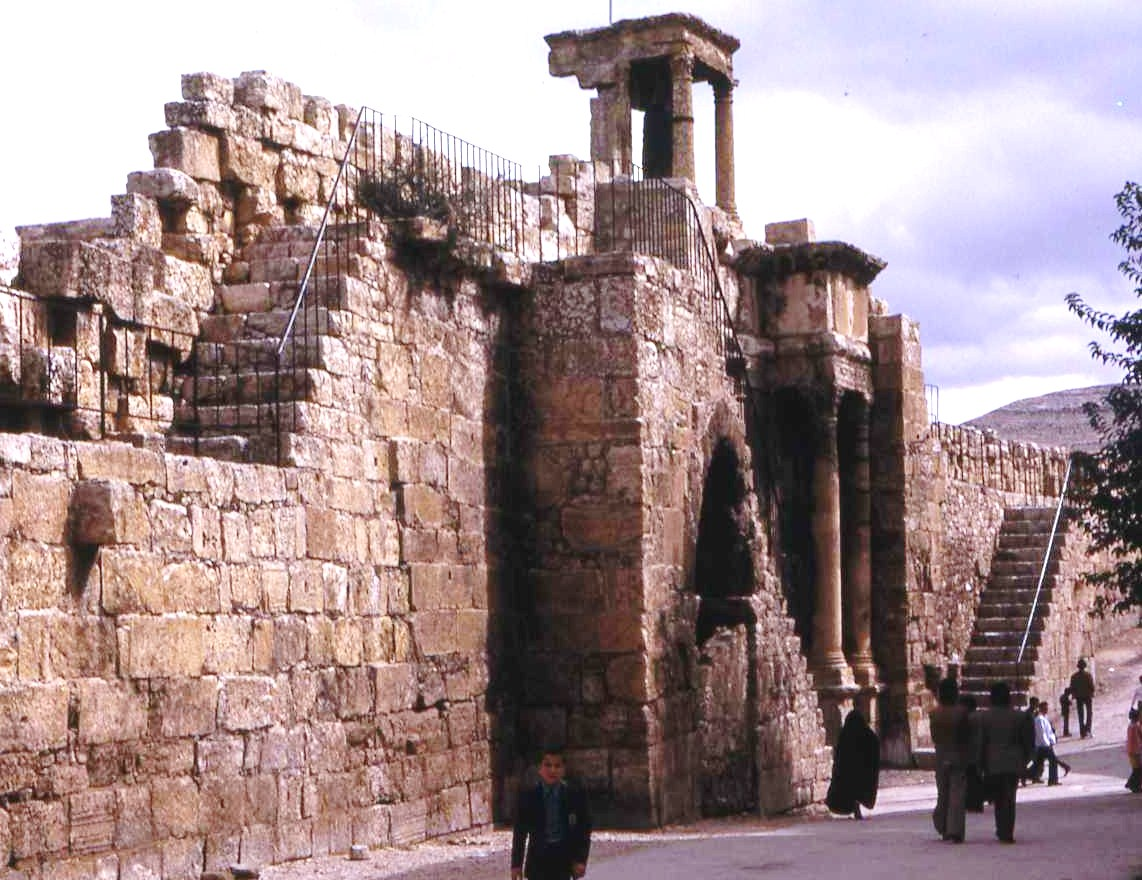
Ruins of the Byzantine city walls of Theveste, one of the many cities reconquered and fortified by Salomon.

In 534, immediately after his victory over the Vandals, Belisarius had already conquered the traditional Roman legionary site of Septem, which at least at that point was no longer under Vandal rule. The extent of further conquests in the Mauretania Tingitana is not known, mainly because the retention of Roman culture and Latin language does not allow any compelling conclusions to be drawn about an Eastern Roman reconquest. The possession of Tingis, today's Tangier, can be considered reasonably certain.

More important than seizing the western outpost was to bring Numidia under control, particularly the Aurès mountain region and the areas bordering to the north. With its mountain ridge, this province played a special role in defense as early as in classical Roman times and at the same time represented the outer edge of the agriculturally usable area opposite the Sahara, its south-western edge representing a natural border. This was to be the task of the praetorian prefect Solomon, who was called back to Africa in 539. In 484, a few years after the death of Geiseric, the Berber tribes living there had renounced the Vandal Kingdom, with their chief Masties proclaiming himself the "Emperor" of a Roman-Berber Empire. His successor Iaudas could not prevent Solomon building a Byzantine fortress in Timgad in the summer of 539 including a resettlement of this city. In the years 539/540 he finally lost despite a sensational ambush using irrigation canals after the battle of Babosis and Zerboule against the Eastern Romans under Solomon and had to flee to the adjacent Mauretania Caesariensis. However, individual remnant areas of this Roman-Berber empire south of the Aurès mountain ridge survived until the Arab conquest in 701. At an unspecified date (541?) the regions north of the Chott el Hodna followed, especially around the city Setifis, possibly in conjunction with the Kingdom of Altava.

Of these regions reconquered and reincorporated from the Roman-Berber petty kings, Numidia in particular was to be the base of the mobile Byzantine troops in Africa until shortly before the end of Byzantine rule, not least because of its location on the middle section of the border. Even if the directive of Justinian I was not fully implemented and large parts of the interior of the three Mauritanian provinces remained outside imperial control, the reconquests represented a doubling of the eastern Roman territory in the pre-Vandal Roman Africa and at the same time shortened the border, making it effective to manage. In the following period, various fortresses were built on both the border as well as within the area ruled by the Eastern Romans.

Then there was a reorganization of the administration. Thus, the coastal areas of Mauretania Caesarensis and Mauretania Sitifensis were combined to form a province of Mauretania Prima, whereas the Eastern Roman possessions in Mauretania Tingitana were combined with the Balearic Islands and possibly also Spania to form the province of Mauretania Secunda. The areas inland of the Mauretania Sitifensis, on the other hand, were probably added to Numidia in 553/555.

=== Plague and military crisis 543–548 ===
In 543, the Plague of Justinian reached the cities of Egypt by sea and spread through the trade routes within the province. Those Berbers who kept their traditional way of life were spared. To the extent that they were hostile to the Eastern Roman Empire, they waited for the epidemic to subside and then rose up. This was accompanied by a series of revolts by Berbers belonging to the empire, led by their leader Antalas, fueled by the assassination of his brother and his removal from the Byzantine payroll. The climax of this uprising was a sensational Byzantine defeat in the spring of 544 at Cilium (today Kasserine), which cost the life of the praetorian prefect and general Solomon. The result was further uprisings by Berbers and Vandals under Guntarith, a Vandal nobleman who had previously also been in Byzantine service. Neither the new praetorian prefect Sergius nor the new magister militum Areobindus were able to get the situation under control. It was only under the leadership of the magister militum John Troglita that Vandal attempts at restoration under Guntarith and Stotzas the Younger were thwarted in 546. The Eastern Roman campaigns between 544 and 547 initially led to failures in Tripolitania, but also to an advance as far as inland Ghirsa, the consequent destruction of this cultural center of the Berber clan of the Leuathae (belonging to the Zanata tribal group). Finally, in 548, the Eastern Roman troops succeeded in decisively defeating and subjugating the Berbers under Antalas on the "Fields of Cato".

=== Years of peace (548–569) and local revolt (563) ===
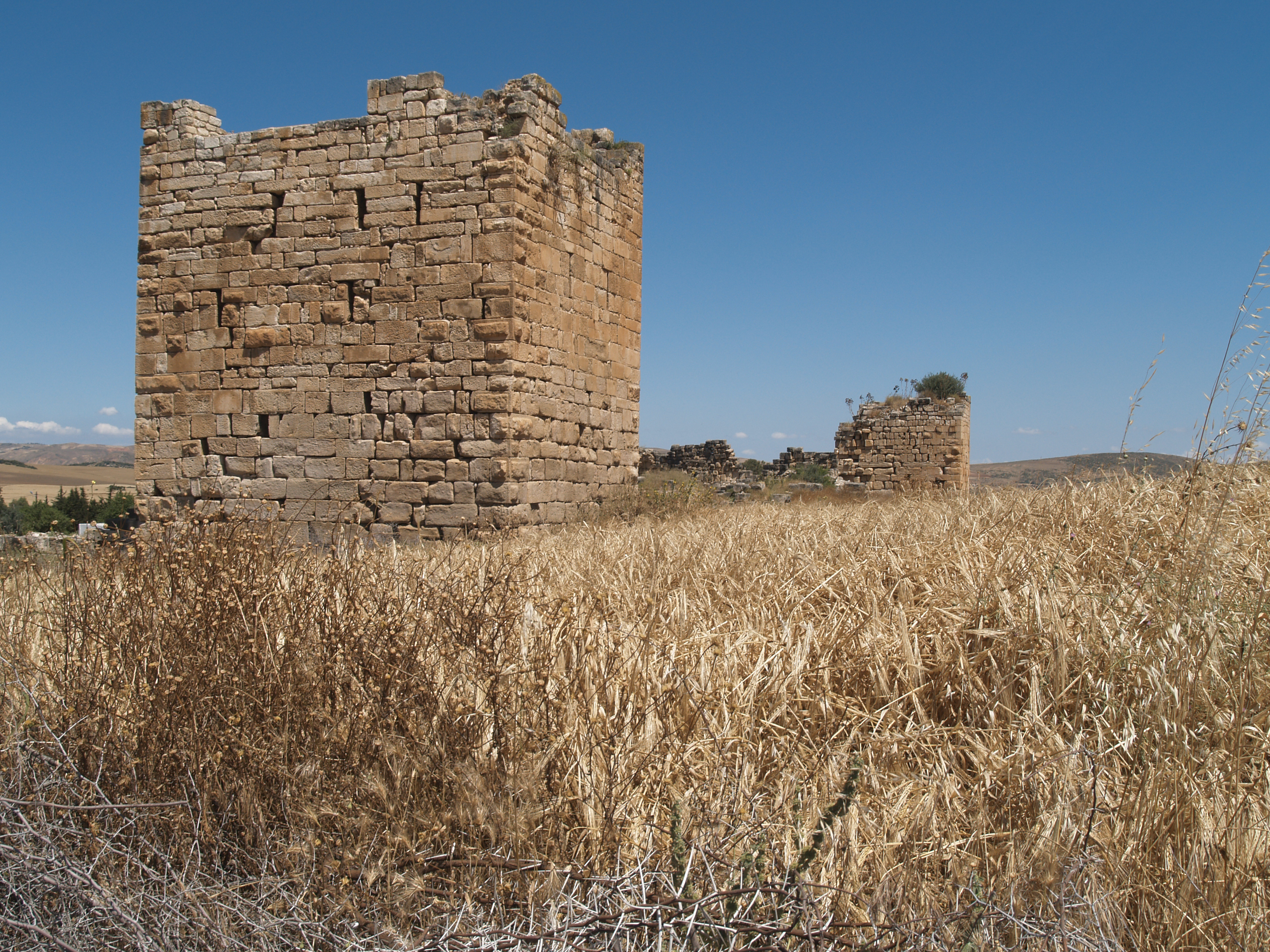
Remains of Thignica (Aïn Tounga) near Dougga, an interior fort arguably erected after the death of Justinian I.

After this victory of John Troglita, there are no records of battles in Africa until well after his death (552). The praetorian prefecture of Africa was drawn into the Gothic War in 552/553 by the temporary occupation of Corsica and Sardinia, but the African mainland was spared. Only in December 562 did a local revolt break out when the Berber leader Cutzinas, who had been loyal to the empire since the times of John Troglita, was murdered when he wanted to receive his reward. This led to an uprising led by his sons, which required a temporary expeditionary army to be sent from the eastern Roman heartland to combat them. The praetorian prefect Johannes Rogathinus blamed for the assassination and the unrest that accompanied it was deposed in 564 and appointed a successor named Thomas in 564 or 565. In negotiations, this successor was able to restore the loyalty of the affected Berber tribe. The death of Emperor Justinian in 565 brought changes to Byzantine North Africa, but no turning point. New fortifications are known to have been built, such as the Thubursicu Bure Fortress in 565–569 and possibly the Thignica Fortress at the same time. The years 565-569 were also shaped by the expansion of diplomatic relations with the Garamantes in Fezzan, who were converting to Christianity, and the Maccurites (probably in Mauretania).

=== War against the Roman-Berber Kingdom of Altava (570–579) ===
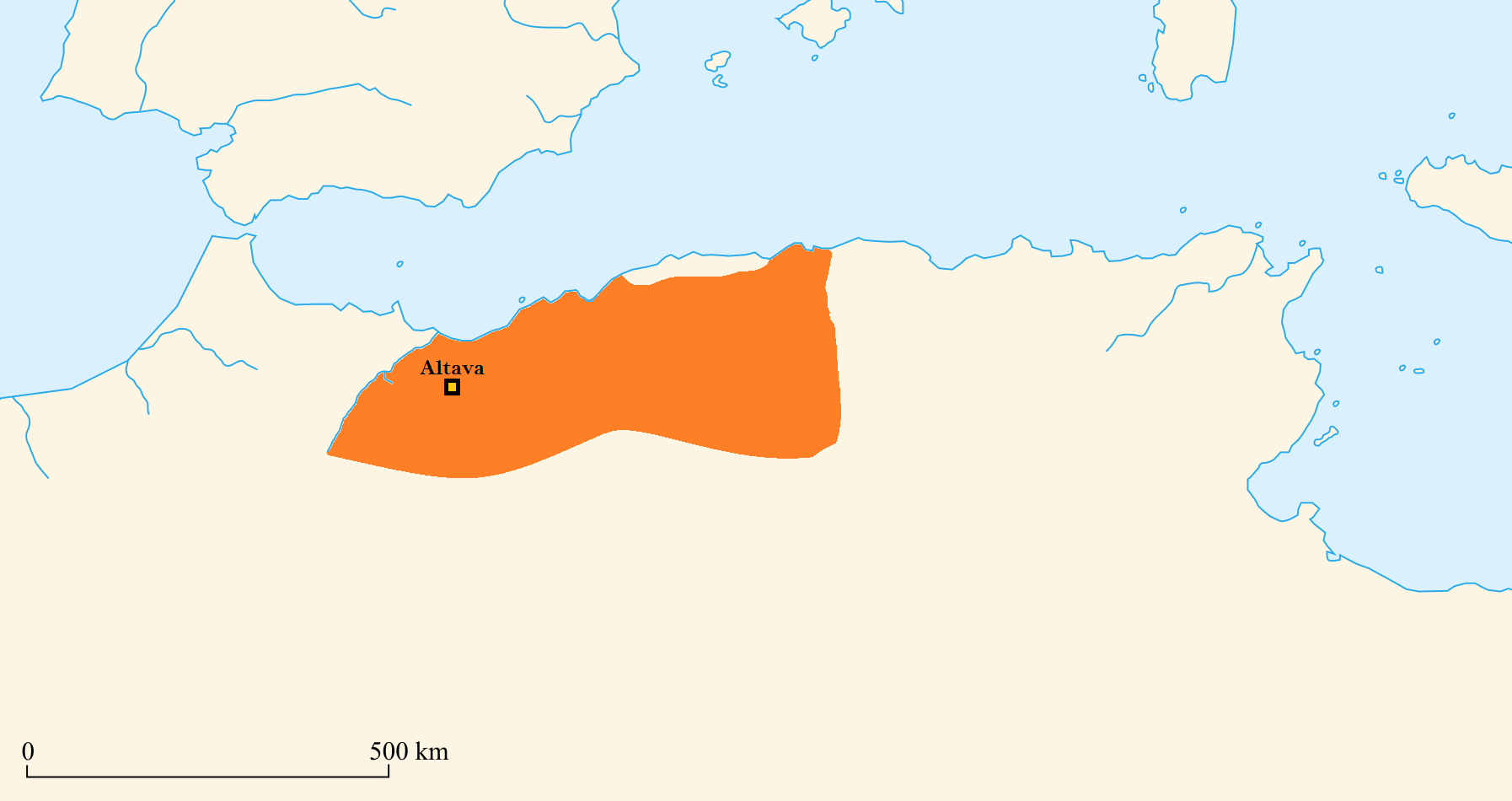
Roman-Berber kingdom of Altava before 578, comprising the Mauretania Caesarenis excluding a Byzantine coastal strip in the east, but including interior parts of the Mauretania Sitifensis and Mauretania Tingitana

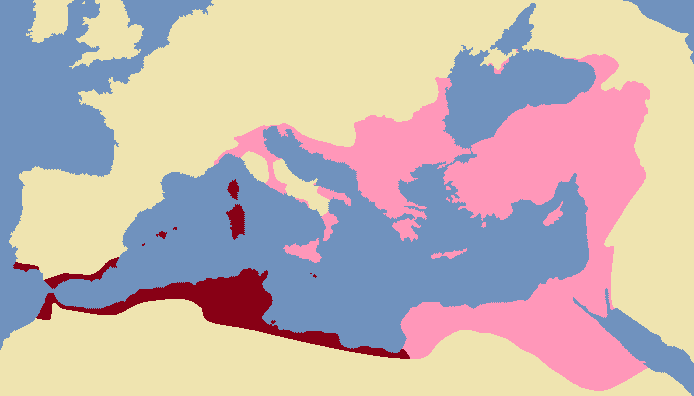
Dark red: possible extension of Byzantine rule in the Maghreb at the close of the sixth century, assuming that territories of the Altava kingdom were actually conquered.

The years of peace ended in 569/570 when there was a conflict with the Kingdom of Altava – which had previously probably expanded together with the Eastern Roman Empire at the expense of the other small states. At this point it comprised mostly the Mauretania Caesariensis with the exception of the Byzantine coastal strip to the east, making it the most important and largest of the Roman-Berber states.

The causes of this confrontation with the Eastern Roman Empire after more than 30 years of rather peaceful relations are not known. Possibly the causes were similar to the previous Berber wars and/or a certain amount of power that the kingdom of Altava had at that time. The persecution of Donatists and other religious minorities in the Eastern Roman Empire cannot be completely dismissed in view of the Donatist strongholds in western Mauritania and the associated influence on the Kingdom of Altava, although there are sources of increased persecution from the period up to 569/570 not available.

In any case, the praetorian prefect Theodor was killed by Berbers from the Altava kingdom during this period. Around 570/571 the king of Altava, Garmules, succeeded in defeating and killing two magistri militiae, Theoctistus and Amabilis. His actions, combined with the attacks of the Visigoths on the province of Hispania ulterior and the invasion of the Lombards in Italy, which had already begun in 568, represented a threat to the Eastern Roman power in the entire western Mediterranean area. Tiberius II Constantine called – either still in his function as Caesar or already as emperor – Thomas again in the office of praetorian prefect and the capable general Gennadius to magister militum to put an end to the campaigns of Garmules. Here, the Emperor Gennadius transferred some civil powers, which he anticipated parts of the reforms of his successor. The emperor may have reinforced the eastern Roman garrison in Africa by transferring some of the 15,000 mercenaries there that had probably been recruited earlier under his rule. This is supported by the fact that the emperor had the necessary breathing space by defeating the Persians in the Battle of Melitene in 576.

All that is known about the subsequent fighting is that the preparations were long and thorough, the campaign began in late 577, and Garmules lost battle and life in 578 or 579.

=== Possible annexation of the Roman-Berber Kingdom of Altava ===
So far it has not been clarified whether the Altava area or at least the coastal strip was subsequently incorporated into the Eastern Roman Empire. Only the expansion of Byzantine fortresses by Gennadius is discussed, but not their locations. In any case, the question of the incorporation of parts of the Kingdom of Altava into the Eastern Roman dominion has not yet been researched, which is why only arguments for or against the thesis can be used at the moment.

No further expansion	Incorporation of the coastal areas	Conquest/subjugation of the entire territory
There are no sources about the construction of Byzantine fortresses.; The source situation regarding the conquest of areas of the Kingdom of Altava is poor.; No further fighting is known in this part of the Byzantine Maghreb. A connection to the formerly peaceful relations between the Roman-Berber Kingdom of Altava and the Eastern Roman Empire seems conceivable. Since the Eastern Roman Empire had been at war with Persia again since 572, a settlement seems likely in order to withdraw possible reinforcements back to the east, especially since the Persian Great King Khosrow I, who was fond of peace negotiations, died in 579.; The preservation of the Roman character, as with the cities further west, does not allow any conclusions to be drawn about the restoration of Roman rule. Close cultural and economic ties are also conceivable, especially as this was not uncommon in antiquity, even between states that were proven to exist.	The absence of Byzantine fortress ruins does not mean that Byzantine rule was absent. No ruined forts exist west of Setif and Tobna, although there is evidence of Byzantine rule extending further west on the coast beyond Caesarea.; Under the Eastern Roman emperors up to and including Maurice there was a claim to bring all of pre-Vandal Roman Africa back under imperial control. This was also implemented in the realm of feasibility.; To rule the coastal strip, a strong fleet was needed, which the Byzantine Empire had at its disposal.; The continued existence of a larger Roman-Berber state would have remained a permanent threat and thus a source of further conflicts. This threat has been proven to be eliminated, for which a weakening was already sufficient.; Nothing is reported about fighting from the other parts of the Byzantine Maghreb until the first Arab advance.	Gennadius had a large number of troops available for a complete elimination, which might even have been reinforced from the old empire. In addition, as can be seen, he was the focus of the emperor's troop reinforcements, which is all the more remarkable given that the Eastern Roman Empire was again at war with Persia at this time.; Judging by the extensive preparations, the campaign was surprisingly successful.; The information on the subsequent battles with the Berbers up to 584 show a temporal connection to the short, rapid campaign against the Altavian king Garmules and could refer to the elimination of pockets of resistance.; Possibly, Gennadius will have been content with smashing the Kingdom of Altava and having his supremacy recognized by the splinter states.

=== Last years of the Praetorian Prefecture ===
From the period after Gennadius' campaign against the kingdom of Altava, only the explanations of Theophylactos Simokates indicate that the fighting with the weakened "Berbers" 584 had abated and that it in "all of Africa" had flared up again in 587. Due to this state of affairs, the merging of civil and military powers then became necessary.

== The Exarchate of Africa 591–698 ==
Whereas the Balkans were devastated by Avars and Slavs and Persian troops conquered eastern provinces, Africa enjoyed at least comparative stability.

The defense of the conquered territories not only strained the resources of the empire in North Africa. The constant threat, much more so in Italy by the Lombards and in southern Spain by the Visigoths, forced the Eastern Romans to decentralize civil and military power in the conquered areas, especially since the old empire was defending itself against the Avars and Slavs in the Balkans and again since 572 of the Persian Sassanids in Asia Minor, Armenia and Syria was also exposed to some threats in his heartland. Securing the eastern provinces, which were richer, and much more directly connected to security of Constantinople itself, had to take precedence over holding the western possessions.

Under these conditions, Maurice created the exarchates of Carthage and Ravenna in order to grant his governors the greatest possible freedom of action in these areas, which were now largely left to themselves. In doing so, he granted them the powers of de facto viceroys. While civil and military powers had been separated since the early 4th century in the Later Roman Empire and this principle was maintained in the original – i.e. assigned to Eastern half at the time of partition – Byzantine land, until the mid-7th century with the introduction of theme system, this principle was now abandoned in the western possessions. This bundling of powers along with the obviously stable conditions in the economically strongest province of the former western empire led to a momentum of its own, which – favored by chaotic conditions in other parts of the empire – led to revolts against the imperial central authority in Constantinople. This development came to an end with the appearance of the Arabs, around half a century before the definitive end of Byzantine rule on the African continent.

=== The Exarchate between 591 and 642 ===
==== The Exarchate under Maurice ====
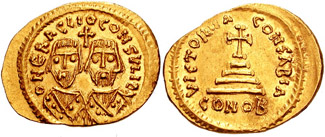
Solidus of Heraclius, the Exarch of Carthage, dating to 608 and depicting him with his namesake son as Consul.

In the province of Africa, the separation of civil and military powers was repeatedly broken due to warlike events during Justinian I's lifetime, especially in the case of Solomon as praetorian prefect and Gennadius as magister militum. In this respect, the founding of the exarchates by Maurice was merely an institutionalization of what had already proven itself in times of crisis. The founding of the Exarchate in Africa meant that Gennadius was also given the rest of the civil powers of the Praetorian Prefect and that this office was now subordinated to the Exarch – a process that must have taken place between May 6, 585 and July 591.

Gennadius was able to achieve victories against the Berbers during his tenure as the first exarch (591-598), in 591 and in Tripolitania in 595. This, coupled with his earlier victory over Altava, brought decades of peace and prosperity to the province of Africa. This is at least obvious because of the lack of contrary records or corresponding archaeological finds from the period. In addition, today's Maghreb was already a region in classical Roman times whose long border had to be secured with just one legion and has always been considered unproblematic. Only a new plague epidemic in 599/600 is mentioned in the written sources, which was probably less serious than the first wave of the "Justinianic Plague". It is also known that at the end of the sixth century the region of Tripolitania was detached from the Exarchate of Carthage and annexed to Byzantine Egypt. Due to the overall situation in Africa, Emperor Maurice had his back free to negotiate an advantageous peace with Persia (see Roman-Persian War of 572-591) and then to oppose the Avars and Slavs (see Maurice's Balkan campaigns).

==== The Exarchate during the last Roman-Persian War ====
Even when the most devastating of all Roman-Persian wars broke out and the situation in large parts of the empire deteriorated massively under Emperor Phocas, conditions in Africa were much more stable. Heraclius the Elder, presumably the successor of Gennadios and probably appointed exarch by Maurice at the age of over 60, could mint coins and hire mercenaries.

During this period only remote Septem could have been (temporarily) conquered by the Visigoths (616). Heraclius the Elder was initially involved – possibly in association with the Sanhāja and Zanata – in battles against other Berber tribes – especially near the Aurès and possibly also near the former kingdom of Altava.

When Heraclius the Elder and his namesake son Heraclius revolted against the emperor in 608, they first fanned dissatisfaction with Phocas in Constantinople by imposing an embargo on grain and (olive) oil and significantly reducing the capital's supply of these staple foods. Then, in the fall of 609, they sent their nephew/cousin Niketas to Egypt with an army, which he brought under his control in the spring of 610. In the spring/summer of 610, Heraclius (the younger) sailed to Constantinople with a fleet mostly manned by Berbers, where he overthrew Phocas from October 2 to 5, 610 and had him publicly executed.

What is remarkable about this usurpation is that Africa could be stripped of its troops without immediately coming into military danger – a situation that would have been unthinkable in the Moorish wars of 533-548. A few years later, during the last and greatest Persian war (603 to 628) Heraclius – facing Persian troops on the Asian side of the Bosphorus – considered to move the capital of the empire from Constantinople to Carthage. This impressively demonstrates the stability and power of the Exarchate of Africa at this time. However, the emperor was dissuaded from these plans by Sergios I, the Patriarch of Constantinople. As the war progressed, the Persian Sassanid Empire occupied Egypt, including Cyrenaica, for a good decade, but the Persians did not advance to Tripolitania, probably due to a lack of the necessary logistical capacities and the ability to operate in desert terrain. Constantinople, on the other hand, defied its first siege in 626 and Heraclius finally defeated the Sassanids in 627/628, which also removed the temporary threat to the Exarchate of Carthage.

Otherwise little is known about the conditions in Byzantine Africa until 633, except that trade with the eastern Mediterranean as a whole declined again after a steady increase until the late 6th century, which was certainly due to the temporary conquests of the Persians and the more final ones of the Arabs in the eastern Mediterranean and the associated effects on the corresponding sales markets have been accelerated.

=== Defence against the Arabs ===
As a part of the Islamic expansion, Byzantine rule in the Maghreb came to an end after tough fighting. Unlike in Asia Minor, where the Arab attacks ultimately repelled, the southern half of the Mediterranean was conquered by the Arabs within a good half a century. Responsible for this were insufficient precautions, an essentially defective coordination with Berbers and the Byzantine heartland – which against the background of the Monothelite disputes – which included the African resistance to imperially decreed forced conversions of Jews – culminating in a failed secession – and, to a lesser extent, geography. The process was also spurred by the struggles of the empire in the other provinces, in particular a strong Arab pressure on Asia Minor, but also the invasion of the Proto-Bulgarians in the Lower Danubian provinces are significant. It is also believed that the Byzantine fortresses, smaller than predecessors in pre-Vandal Roman times, were only effective against tribal uprisings and Berber attacks, but not against larger armies, which, however, can be contradicted by the considerable difficulties the Arabs had in their advance, especially in Numidia.

Above all, after several decades of war against the Sasanian Empire, Eastern Rome/Byzantium was completely exhausted in all the aspects, especially since most battles had taken place on Eastern Roman territory. The East Roman army was also demobilized for financial reasons after the long wars against the Persians and required considerable time to be reactivated. This point contributed to the rapid Arab successes quite significantly.

==== Early invasions ====
The Islamic expansion: Expansion under Muhammad, 622–632 Expansion under the Rashidun Caliphate, 632–661 Expansion under the Umayyad Caliphate, 661–750

Africa was first confronted with Islamic expansion in 633, when Peter, the Exarch of Carthage, is said to have defied an order from Heraclius, on the advice of the Greek monk Maximus Confessor, to send troops to support the defensive battle in Egypt. Even after the conquest of Egypt by the Arabs, the exarchate probably still did not take the threat seriously enough. It is highly probable that being spared Persian invasion and the overestimation of the inhospitable terrains between Egypt and the Exarchate (especially the Surt) were the cause. Refugees from Egypt were also known from the time of the occupation by Persian troops. In addition, there is no record of a retreat by Byzantine troops along the Libyan coast in the 640s. The Exarchate was unprepared for defense against a land attack from the east. No forts were built on the border of Tripolitania, part of Byzantine Egypt, comparable to the Mareth Line used in the African campaign of World War II. An operative concept for a successful fight against the Arabs was still being sought throughout the empire.

The first Arab expeditions were led by the Emir Amr ibn al-As and his nephew ʿUqba ibn Nafiʿ in 642/43 from the newly conquered Egypt to the west. Advances into Cyrenaica and Tripolitania met little resistance, anyway, the Byzantine control was limited to a few coastal bases, from which Oea (today Tripoli) and Sabratha were plundered, the siege of Oea seems to have taken a long time. After the Arabs conquered Alexandria again and forever in 646, the Byzantine Empire's weakness in the southern Mediterranean became apparent. The resulting domino effect seems to have been misunderstood in Carthage as an exclusive problem for Egypt and the old empire in general, despite a significant number of refugees from Egypt, which had also included Tripolitania for around 50 years. This was probably still favored by the greater attention paid to previous enemies, here the Lombards and their conquest of Liguria from 643, and by the need for the Arab troops to reorganize themselves after the storming of Tripolitania, especially from a logistical point of view.

In 646 the Exarch Gregory the Patrician, son of aforementioned Nicetas, thus also a member of Heraclian Dynasty, rebelled against the emperor, also against the background of the monothelite disputes in Byzantium and in the alleged misconception that fighting between Arabs and Byzantines in Egypt would deter either side from attacking Africa. He decided to secede from Constantinople and moved the capital of exarchate to Sufetula/Sbeitla. According to Arabic sources, his power was so great that he was able to gather around 100,000 Berber soldiers, which was hardly realistic.

The Arabs, meanwhile, had probably learned of Heraclius' failed plan in 633 to detach troops from Africa to defend Egypt, and probably wanted to avoid such a plan being carried out in the future. They bypassed Oea, which had once again braced itself against an Arab siege, and invaded the exarchate from Tripolitania, which had been spared major fighting for almost 100 years. The rebellious exarch Gregory rallied his own troops and allies to the new capital of Sufetula, but without support from the central government in Constantinople. According to Arabic sources, when he faced the Arabs led by Abd Allah ibn Sa'd for battle, he was able to mobilize 120,000 to 200,000 men (which, like many such high figures, is probably clearly exaggerated for logistical reasons alone), but lost the battle and possibly his life. The Arabs then ravaged Byzacena within the next 12 to 15 months.

==== Tribute payments and renewed attacks ====
Possible boundaries of the Byzantine empire (orange) around 650 C.E.

The Arabs retreated to Tripolitania in 648 after receiving a large ransom, which increased their desires for this rich province and thus, in the long run, served the opposite purpose. Under the new exarch Gennadios II, Byzantine supremacy was restored and the capital of the exarchate was moved back to Carthage, especially since Gregory had only moved the administrative seat inland to Sufetula out of fear of a punitive Byzantine expedition by sea. Nevertheless, due to the temporary secession, there remained a longer-term loss of confidence in Africa that went beyond the general distrust of the emperor. Byzantine rule was restored in the areas of the Exarchate overrun by the Arabs, but the extent of this repossession is debatable. Meanwhile, the Byzantine fleet was attacking Muslim areas on the Eastern Mediterranean coast and even recapturing the Barka region in Cyrenaica, those naval activities coming to an end at the latest after the Battle of the Masts in 655 respectively.

The new exarch attempted to pacify the Arabs by paying tribute, presumably under the mistaken belief that the Arabs, like the Berbers, were not interested in permanent conquests. However, the corresponding tax burden led to growing resentment among the population and also among Emperor Constans II. In addition, there may have been a wave of flight or emigration out of fear of another Arab attack.

The real reason for the exarchate's 15-year respite was not due to the tribute payments, but to internal Islamic disputes over the office of caliph. With a failed invasion of Sicily and a minor raid on Byzacena in the 650s, it was clear that the Arabs had not forgotten the West. Under Caliph Mu'awiya I and his general ʿUqba ibn Nafiʿ, major attacks were resumed in 661, albeit initially only as raids. Around 668, Arabs attacked the island of Djerba and the city of Gigthi on the mainland, among other things. These events revealed the Byzantine emperor's inability to organize an effective defense for Africa. The subsequent assassination of Constans II triggered 669 multi-year uprisings in Sicily, which not only prevented the intervention of further Byzantine troops in Africa, but even bound troops from Africa, which made it impossible to counter the new Arab invasion at an early stage. ʿUqba ibn Nafiʿ took advantage of this situation and launched the actual attack in 669. In the meantime, he set up an advanced army camp, laying the foundation for later Kairouan, thus made it possible for the Arab armies to remain there all year round. While Byzantine troops kept sight of fortresses north of Kairouan, they sat idle, whereby the regions south of it were defenseless against the attacks of the Arabs, especially region of Byzacena, except relatively well-defended coastal cities.

While ʿUqba ibn Nafiʿ had successes and (temporary) mass conversions of the Berbers to Islam, he failed to conquer the Byzantine strongholds in the north. Meanwhile, the Caliph had to sign a truce with Emperor Constantine IV due to the failed siege of Constantinople, which enabled Byzantine reinforcements to be sent to Africa. At the same time, due to the (same?) Armistice, it was determined that demarcation line was set along the Zeugitana-Byzacena line, thus Byzacena would be ceded to the Arabs, meanwhile, the Arabs would retreat from the region of Zeugitana (composed of Carthage and its surrounding areas, i.e. Roman/Byzantine Africa in the narrowest sense). However, neither this nor Fitnas prevented the Arabs from invading Numidia from 679, the region that had given Africa strategic depth and recruitment potential, so must therefore have been a thorn in the side of the general ʿUqba in particular. In the Lamasba area (today Mérouana), Lambaesis and Thamugadi he won Pyrrhic victories in 682, which did not prevent him from his advance to the Atlantic. The Exarch was able to achieve a considerable defensive success in 683 when ʿUqba ibn Nafiʿ lost the Battle of Vescera on the way back from the Atlantic against the Berber tribes under their king Kusaila, Byzantine troops and allied units and died in the process. The victors were even able to (re)take Kairouan.

==== Fall of the Exarchate of Carthage ====
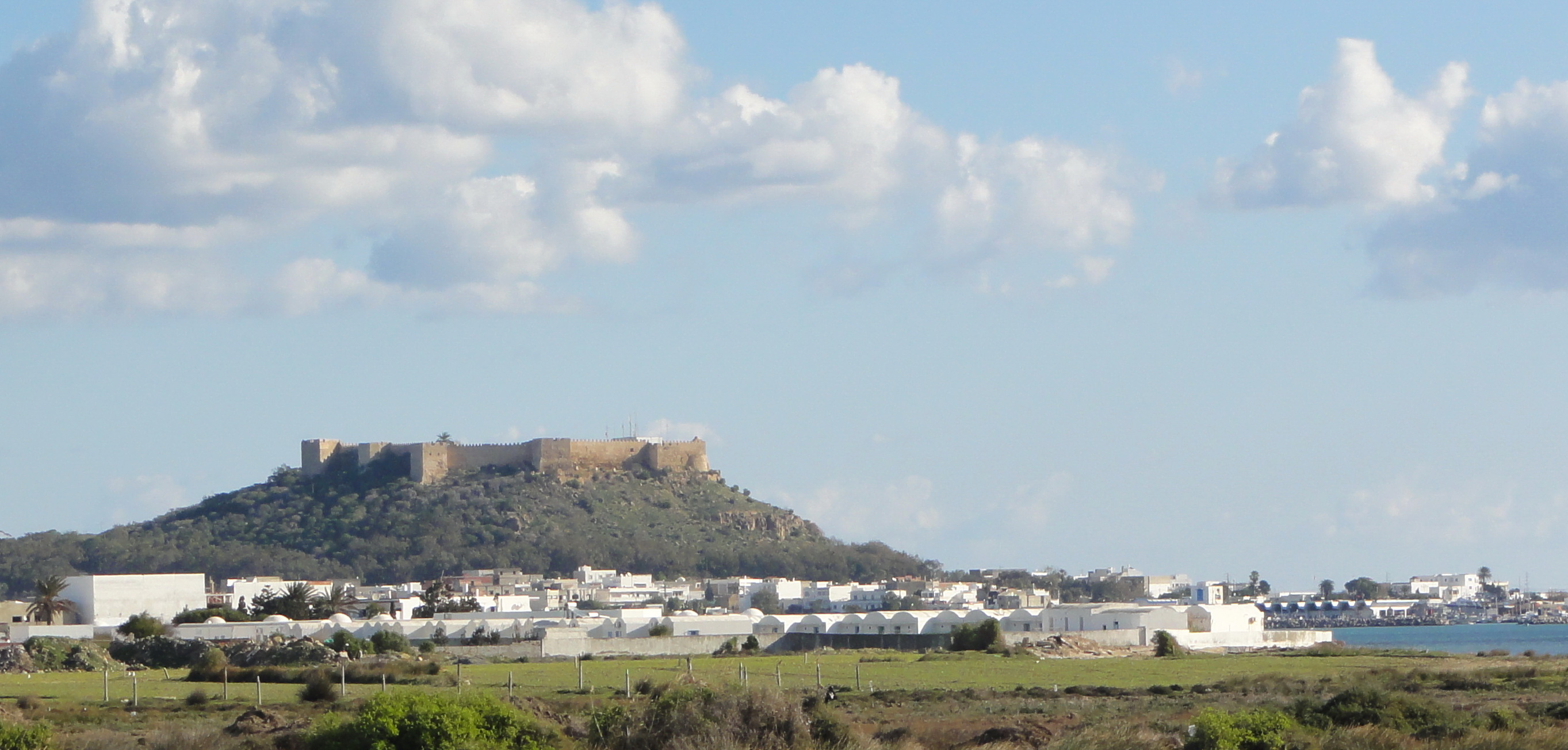
Clupea, allegedly the last fortress held by the Byzantines after the Arab conquest of Carthage, modified during Ottoman rule.

The defeated Arabs retreated to Egypt without their fallen general, giving the Exarchate and the Berbers some respite. But between 686 and 688 Arab armies defeated the Berber ruler Kusaila near Kairouan and, after his tribal alliance broke up, resumed their attacks against the Exarchate. This had been weakened by previous conflicts and had made insufficient use of the recovery phase. The military activities of the Arabs first required a renewed conquest of Barka, but before 688 it was again taken by sea-based Byzantine troops.

In the first half of the 690s, the attacks on Carthage and its environs resumed, but were hampered by the Berber leader Kāhina, who only lost battle and life at Taharqa in the Aures range in 701. The assertion that the exarchate also received reinforcements from the Visigoths, whose king also feared an attack by the Arabs, is not proven. In 697/98 the Arab general Hassan ibn al-Nu'man conquered Carthage for the first time with 40,000 men and was defeated by Kāhina.

On the news of the conquest of Carthage, Emperor Leontios dispatched the Byzantine fleet under the later Emperor Tiberius III The fleet recaptured Carthage in the same year and fought the Arab fleet with varying success, but then went to Crete to pick up reinforcements. As a result, the Arab besiegers – who had initially retreated to Cyrenaica after their double defeat – succeeded in taking and destroying the city in cooperation with their fleet. Individual Byzantine towns and fortresses on the coast further west were probably only gradually conquered after the victory over Kāhina, such as Vaga. In addition, according to Arab sources, Clupea (today Kelibia) near Cape Bon was the last city in Byzantine hands. The remote Septem withstood an Arab siege by Mūsā ibn Nusair in 706, but is said to have fallen to the Arabs at the latest when the Byzantine governor Julian defected, who is said to have supported their attack on the Visigothic kingdom in 711. However, it is uncertain whether this was actually the case and whether Julian was a historical person at all.

== Evaluation ==
In the older literature, the Byzantine rule in the Maghreb is often portrayed as a failed project which, despite the high economic power of the province of Africa, is said to have brought no real benefit to the Eastern Roman Empire, but only constant wars and thus a wear and tear of troops. In fact, the epoch was at times marked by several uprisings against the imperial central authority, by alliances with and battles against Berbers, and later by a joint defensive struggle against the Arabs.

However, the region and its Latin-speaking and partly Neo-Punic-speaking population generally experienced at this time a late antique aftergrowth, which also produced the last important Latin poet of antiquity, Corippus. Under Byzantine rule, civil building projects were also carried out, for example at the port of Carthage, and a number of older buildings restored or put into operation. Overall, the dissolution of the Roman settlement and administrative structures in the region, which became apparent in the late phase of the Western Roman Empire and accelerated in the phase of the Kingdom of the Vandals, was halted by Eastern Roman/Byzantine rule and sometimes even reversed. In addition, East Roman Africa remained politically, economically and culturally closely linked to the Mediterranean world. Overall, the Eastern Roman/Byzantine period was the last epoch of around 750 years of Roman rule in the Maghreb, the outstanding testimony of which is a large number of Byzantine fortresses or fortresses stylistically modeled on them from the earliest epoch of Arab rule (see List of Byzantine forts and other structures in the Maghreb).

With regards to the economy, the reconquest of North Africa under Justinian I was heavily motivated by the strategic and commercial value of the region. By securing the Vandal Kingdom, the Byzantine Empire gained mastery over the fertile agricultural hinterlands and key Mediterranean islands, including Sardinia and Corsica. This territorial expansion allowed the imperial administration to revitalise the port of Carthage, aiming to harness the region’s high agricultural productivity and claim the lucrative maritime tariffs that had been levied by the Vandal state, which would have made substantial contributions to the treasury. Excavations at Leptiminus reveal a significant increase in the production of amphorae (used for exporting olive oil) and ironworking, likely supported by imperial investment. Additionally, the vast landed estates of the Vandal royalty were seized and transferred directly to the imperial household, ensuring that the revenues from North Africa’s most valuable territories remained under the direct control of the emperor.

The historical significance of the Eastern Roman/Byzantine rule, some of which has continued to the present day, was that it played a key role in stopping the orientalization of the Eastern Roman Empire (and thus the later orthodox faith of Christianity) until the time when in which the eastern provinces broke away from the empire in the Arab storm. Equally significant was that the assumption of the imperial throne from Carthage in 610 saved the empire from collapse and thus set the course for the next 843 years. In addition, the reorganization of late antique administration into exarchates both in Italy and in Africa created the prototype for the theme administration, with which the structure of the exarchate was broken down so far that secessions could be ruled out. Overall, according to Conant, the reconquest of Africa was a unique success.

Another aspect is the extensive preservation and partial restoration of related Roman administrative structures and economic power, which the Arabs found in the course of Islamic expansion and which they may have served as the basis for establishing their own connected sphere of power from the 8th century onwards. This circumstance continued to have an effect until the 13th century and decisively shaped the development of today's Maghreb as a region.

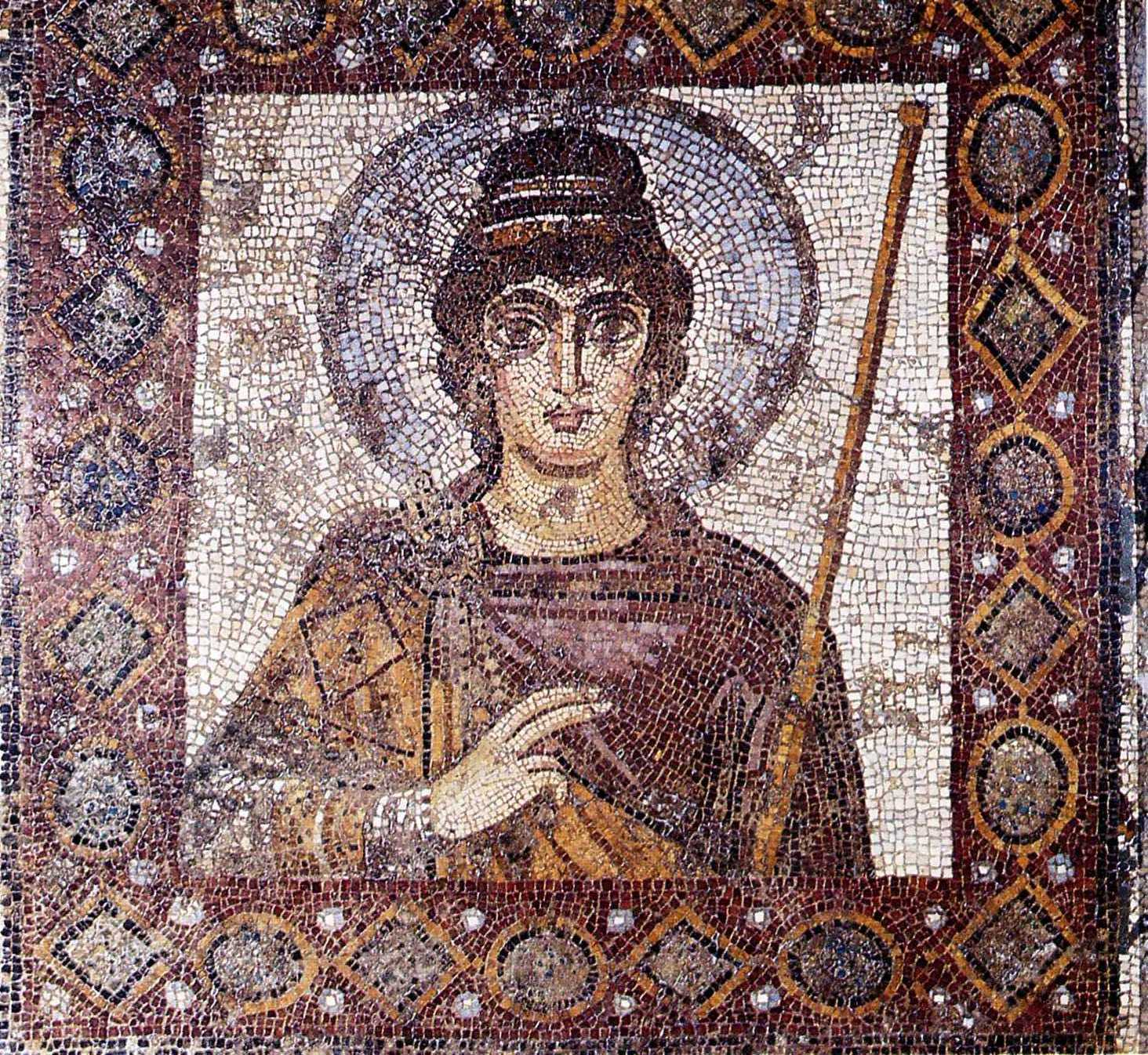
The lady of Carthage (likely Theodora I.), a mosaic portrait and one of the most important preserved artefacts of late antiquity in Tunisia.

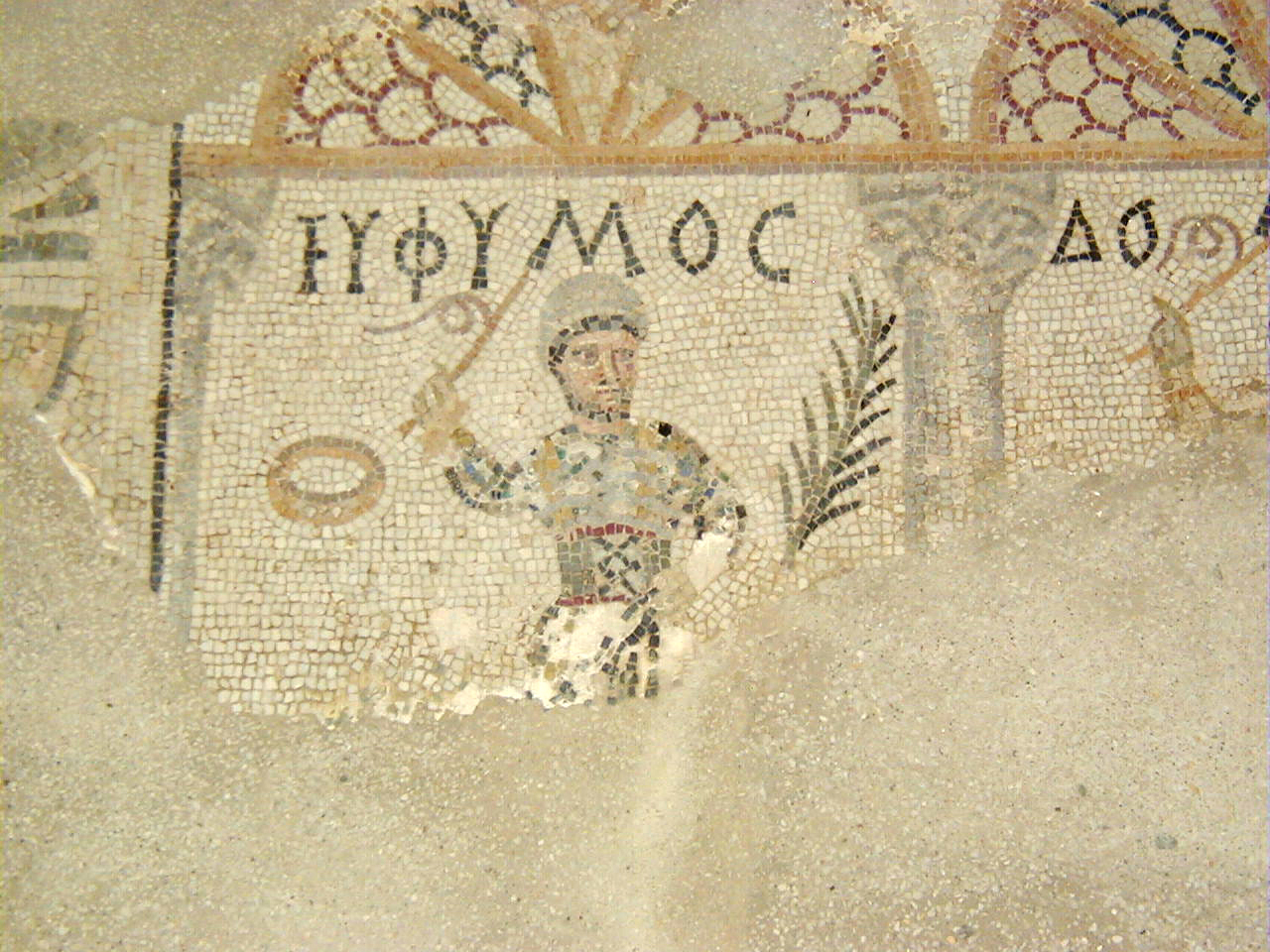
Byzantine mosaic from Carthage, modern-day Tunisia

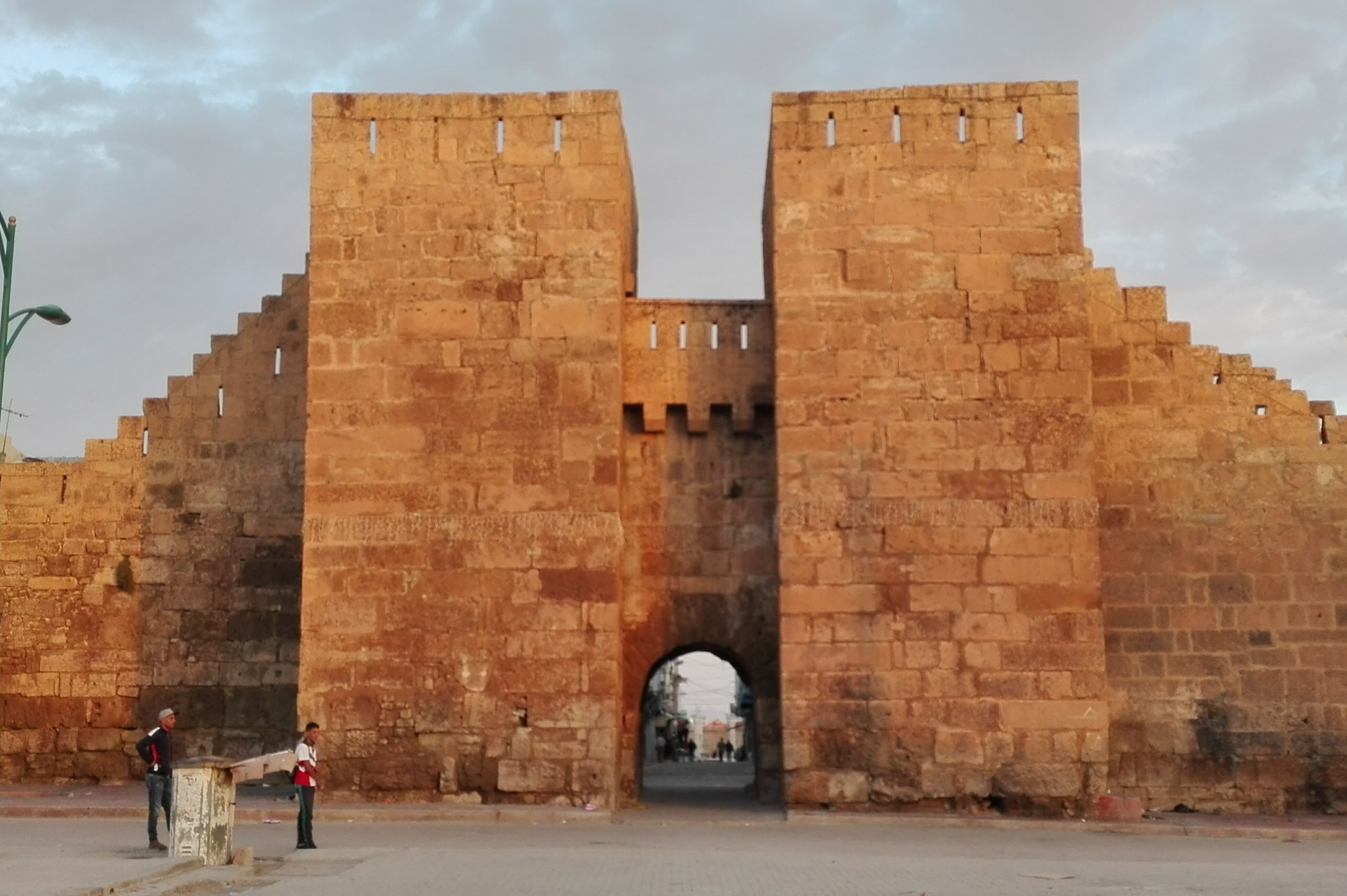
The so-called gate of Solomon, main gate of the Byzantine Theveste in modern-day Algeria

== See also ==
- Roman Egypt
- Muslim conquest of the Maghreb

== Literature ==
- Ralf Bockmann: Africa. In: The Oxford Dictionary of Late Antiquity. Volume 1. Oxford University Press, Oxford 2018, ISBN 978-0-19-881624-9, pages 29–31.
- Michael Brett, Elizabeth Fentress: The Berbers. Blackwell Publishing, Oxford 1996, ISBN 0-631-20767-8.
- Averil Cameron: Byzantine Africa: The Literary Evidence. In: Excavations at Carthage conducted by the University of Michigan. Band 7: 1978. Cérès, Tunis 1982, S. 29–62.
- Averil Cameron: Vandal and Byzantine Africa. In: Averil Cameron, Bryan Ward-Perkins, Michael Whitby (editor): The Cambridge Ancient History. Volume 14: Late Antiquity. Empire and Successors. AD 425–600. Cambridge University Press, Cambridge 2000, ISBN 0-521-32591-9, pages 552–569.
- Gabriele Crespi: Die Araber in Europa. Special Edition, Belser, Stuttgart 1992, ISBN 3-7630-1730-5, S. 21–36 (First print of the German translation 1983).
- Jonathan Conant: Staying Roman. Conquest and Identity in Africa and the Mediterranean, 439–700 (= Cambridge Studies in Medieval Life and Thought. Series 4, 82). Cambridge University Press, Cambridge, 2012, ISBN 978-0-521-19697-0.
- Jadran Ferluga: Exarch/Exarchat. In: Lexikon des Mittelalters. Volume 4, Artemis-Verlag, München u. a. 1989, ISBN 3-7608-8904-2, column 454 f.
- Walter E. Kaegi: Muslim Expansion and Byzantine Collapse in North Africa. Cambridge University Press, Cambridge 2010, ISBN 978-1-107-63680-4.
- Hugh Kennedy: The Great Arab Conquests. How the Spread of Islam changed the World we live in. Da Capo, Philadelphia PA 2007, ISBN 978-0-306-81585-0.
- Andy H. Merrills (editor): Vandals, Romans and Berbers. New Perspectives on Late Antique North Africa. Ashgate, Aldershot 2004, ISBN 0-7546-4145-7.
- Yves Moderan: Les Maures et l'Afrique romaine, IV–VII siècle (= Bibliothèque des Écoles françaises d'Athènes et de Rome. Band 314). École Française de Rome, Rom 2003, ISBN 2-7283-0640-0.
- Denys Pringle: The Defence of Byzantine Africa from Justinian to the Arab Conquest. An Account of the Military History and Archaeology of the African Provinces in the Sixth and Seventh Century (= British Archaeological Reports. International Series. 99). British Archaeological Reports, Oxford 1981, ISBN 0-86054-119-3 (Reprint 2001).
- Susan Raven: Rome in Africa. 3. Auflage. Routledge, London, 1993, ISBN 0-415-08150-5, pages 209–230.
- Susan T. Stevens, Jonathan P. Conant (editor): North Africa under Byzantium and Early Islam (Dumbarton Oaks Byzantine symposia and colloquia). Dumbarton Oaks Research Library & Collection, Washington (D. C.) 2016, ISBN 978-0-88402-408-8.
- Elizabeth W.B. Fentress: Numidia and the Roman Army. Social, Military and Economic Aspects of the Frontier Zone(= British Archaeological Reports. International Series. 53). British Archaeological Reports, Oxford 1981, ISBN 978-0-86054-044-1
