= Gennadius (7th century) =

- Died: c. 665
- Military career
- Service years: 648–665
- Rank: Exarch of Africa
- Commands: Exarchate of Africa

Gennadius (Greek: Γεννάδιος, romanized: Gennádios, died c. 665), was a Byzantine general who exercised the role of Exarch of Africa from 648 to 665. In 664 Gennadius rebelled against Emperor Constans II and was himself overthrown the next year by a loyalist uprising. He is sometimes enumerated as Gennadius II in reference to the 6th century governor of Africa with the same name.

== Biography ==
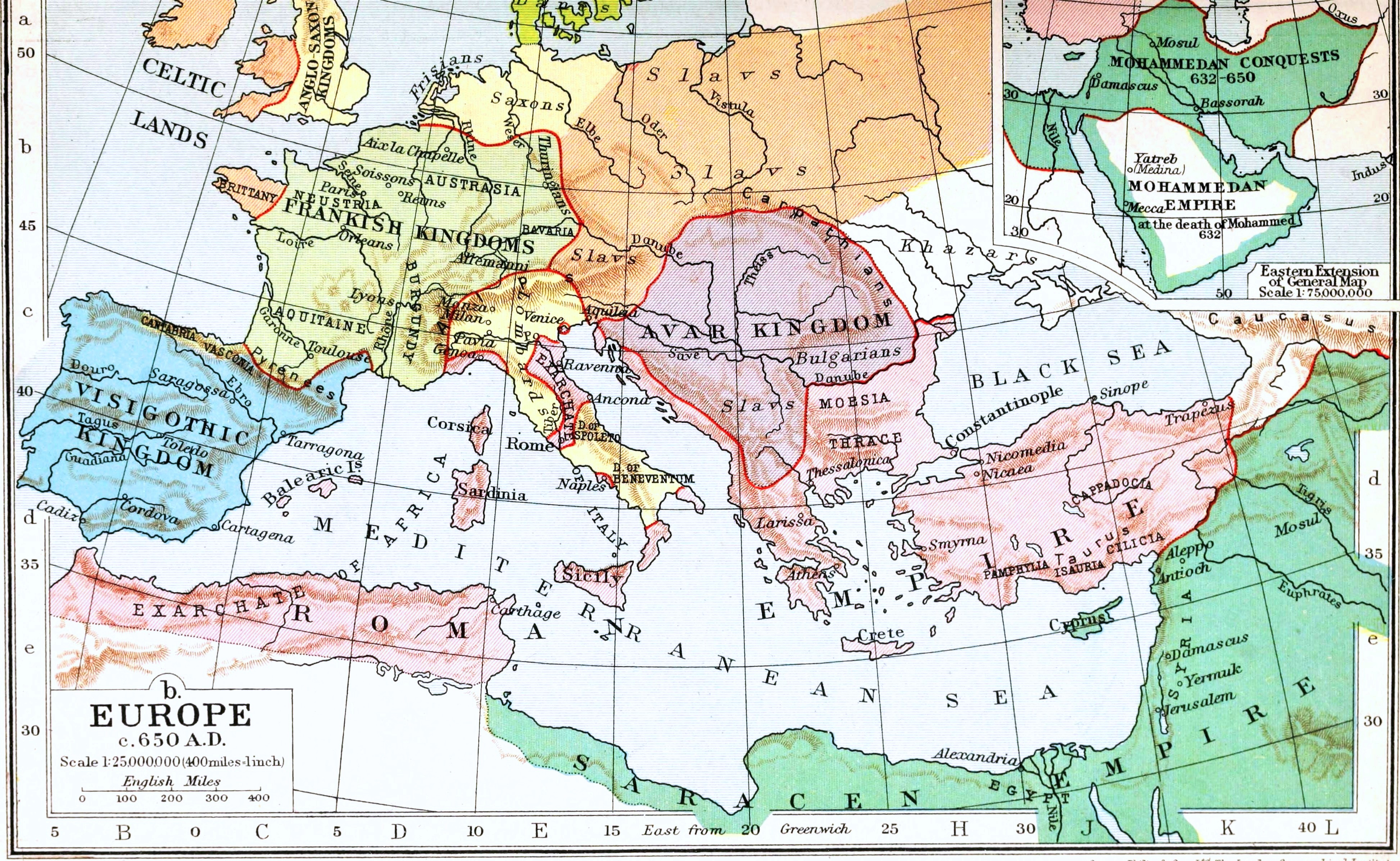
The Mediterranean world at the time of Gennadius

=== Background ===
In 646, the Exarch of Africa Gregory the Patrician launched a rebellion against Constans. The obvious reason was the latter's support for Monothelitism, but it was also a reaction to the Muslim conquest of Egypt, and the threat this presented to Byzantine Africa. Given the failure of the imperial government in Constantinople to stop the Muslim advance, it was, in the words of Charles Diehl, "a great temptation for the powerful governor of Africa to secede from the feeble and remote empire that seemed incapable of defending its subjects". Doctrinal differences, as well as the long-established autonomy of the African exarchate, reinforced this tendency. The Arab chronicler al-Tabari on the other hand claims that Gregory's revolt was provoked by a levy of 300 pounds of gold demanded by Constans.

In 647 the Arab Abdallah ibn Sa'ad invaded the Exarchate with 20,000 men. The Muslims moved through western Tripolitania and advanced up to the northern boundary of the Byzantine province of Byzacena. Gregory confronted the Arabs on their return at the Battle of Sufetula, but was defeated and killed. After the defeat of Gregory the Arab victors raided far and wide across the Exarchate while the Byzantines withdrew to their fortresses.

=== Exarch ===
Gennadius was a Byzantine general who served under the Emperor Constans II (r. 641–668). He assumed the position of Exarch of Africa after the death of Gregory. Although the emperor had not appointed him to the position, he managed to ensure the Arab withdrawal from Byzantine North Africa by promising them an annual tribute of 330,000 nomismata, over two tons of gold, and was confirmed in his position. Like his predecessors, he acknowledged the authority of Constans, and transported to Constantinople the annual excess revenue raised from the province. He nevertheless administered Africa semi-autonomously, without interference from the imperial court, supported by the African bishops who were resolutely Chalcedonian, unlike the Emperor.

The local population was disaffected. The Arab pillaging had caused them to lose faith in the ability of the Byzantines to defend them, while taxation increased sharply to pay the Arab tribute, the requirements of Constantinople and to rebuild the army. The Berber tribes in particular shook off their allegiance to the Empire, and most of southern Tunisia seems to have slipped outside the control of Carthage during Gennadius' tenure.

This situation persisted until 663 when Constans moved the imperial court to Syracuse in Sicily, much closer to the Exarchate, and demanded an increase in tribute. In 664 Gennadius refused to send to Constans the additional revenue and expelled the emperor's representative. This caused an uprising in Africa, where the garrison troops joined with the local citizens, led by Eleutherios the Younger, to expel Gennadius in 665. Eleutherios installed himself as the new exarch and was in time confirmed by Constans. Gennadius fled to the court of Muawiyah I (r. 661–680), 1st caliph of the Umayyad Caliphate at Damascus, where he asked him for aid in recapturing Carthage. The Caliph agreed and sent a large force with Gennadius to invade Byzantine Africa in 665. However, Gennadius died when he reached Alexandria in late 665.

== Footnotes ==
=== References ===
- Charles Diehl (1896). L'Afrique byzantine: histoire de la domination byzantine en Afrique (533-709) (in French). Paris: Pl. XI. OCLC 558415355.
- Hollingsworth, Paul A. (1991). "Gregory". In Kazhdan, Alexander (ed.). The Oxford Dictionary of Byzantium. Oxford and New York: Oxford University Press. p. 875. ISBN 0-19-504652-8.
- Lilie, Ralph-Johannes; Ludwig, Claudia; Pratsch, Thomas; Zielke, Beate (2000). "Gregorios (# 2345)". Prosopographie der mittelbyzantinischen Zeit: 1. Abteilung (641–867), Band 2: Georgios (# 2183) – Leon (# 4270) (in German). Berlin and Boston: De Gruyter. pp. 49–50. ISBN 978-3-11-016672-9.
- Pringle, Denys (1981). The Defence of Byzantine Africa from Justinian to the Arab Conquest: An Account of the Military History and Archaeology of the African Provinces in the Sixth and Seventh Century. Oxford, United Kingdom: British Archaeological Reports. ISBN 0-86054-119-3.
- Treadgold, Warren (1997). A History of the Byzantine State and Society. Stanford, California: Stanford University Press. ISBN 0-8047-2630-2.

Preceded by Gregory	Exarch of Africa ca. 647 – 665	Succeeded by Eleutherios
