= Eleutherios the Younger =

Byzantine official

Eleutherios the Younger was a Byzantine official who overthrew Gennadios and possibly succeeded him as Exarch of Africa.

In 662, the Emperor Constans II left for the empire's western possessions and left his son Constantine IV to rule in Constantinople while Constans embarked on a project to improve the empire's fortifications in the West. In 662, he demanded an increase in tribute from Africa to fund imperial activities in Syracuse in Sicily. The Exarch of Africa, Gennadios refused to provide the additional revenue that Constans demanded and subsequently expelled the emperor's representative. Eleutherios the Younger led the local citizens, who joined a garrison of troops, to expel Gennadios in 665. Gennadios fled to the court of the Umayyad caliph Muawiyah I at Damascus, asking him for aid in recapturing Carthage. In 665, the Caliph sent a force to invade Byzantine Africa, but Gennadios died in late 665, upon reaching Alexandria.

== Sources ==
- Treadgold, Warren (1995). Byzantium and Its Army: 284-1081. Stanford University Press. ISBN 9780804731638.
- Treadgold, Warren (1997). A History of the Byzantine State and Society. Stanford, California: Stanford University Press. ISBN 0-8047-2630-2.
- Pringle, Denys (1981). The Defence of Byzantine Africa from Justinian to the Arab Conquest: An Account of the Military History and Archaeology of the African Provinces in the Sixth and Seventh Century. Oxford, United Kingdom: British Archaeological Reports. ISBN 0-86054-119-3.

Preceded by Gennadios (II)	Exarch of Africa; 665/666 – unknown	Succeeded by Unknown
