= Gregory the Patrician =

Usurper of the Byzantine Empire in Africa (died 647)

Gregory
- Usurper of the Byzantine Empire in Africa
- Reign: 646–647
- Successor: Gennadius (as Exarch)
- Died: 647; Sufetula
- Issue: Amina
- Dynasty: Heraclian
- Father: Nicetas (?)
- Religion: Chalcedonian Christianity

Gregory the Patrician (Greek: Γρηγόριος, romanized: Grēgórios; Latin: Flavius Gregorius, died 647) was a Byzantine Exarch of Africa (modern Tunisia, eastern Algeria and western Libya). A relative of the ruling Heraclian dynasty, Gregory was fiercely pro-Chalcedonian and led a rebellion in 646 against Emperor Constans II over the latter's support for Monothelism. Soon after declaring himself emperor, he faced an Arab invasion in 647. He confronted the invaders but was decisively defeated and killed at Sufetula. Africa returned to imperial allegiance after his death and the Arabs' withdrawal, but the foundations of Byzantine rule there had been fatally undermined.

== Biography ==
Gregory the Patrician was related by blood to Emperor Heraclius (r. 610–641) and his grandson Constans II (r. 641–668), and was possibly the son of Heraclius' cousin Niketas. Gregory is first attested as Exarch of Africa ("patrikios of Africa" in Theophanes) in July 645, but may have been appointed already under Heraclius.

The Exarchate at this time was in internal turmoil due to the conflict between the mainly Orthodox Chalcedonian population and the supporters of Monotheletism, an attempt at compromise between Chalcedonianism and Monophysitism devised and promoted by Heraclius in 638. In Africa, the latter was mostly advocated by refugees from Egypt. In an effort to lessen the tensions, in July 645 Gregory hosted a theological dispute in his capital Carthage between the Chalcedonian Maximus the Confessor and the Monothelite former Patriarch of Constantinople, Pyrrhus. Gregory helped to bring about a reconciliation between the two, and Pyrrhus re-embraced the Chalcedonian position. Over the next few months, several local synods in Africa proceeded to condemn Monotheletism as heresy.

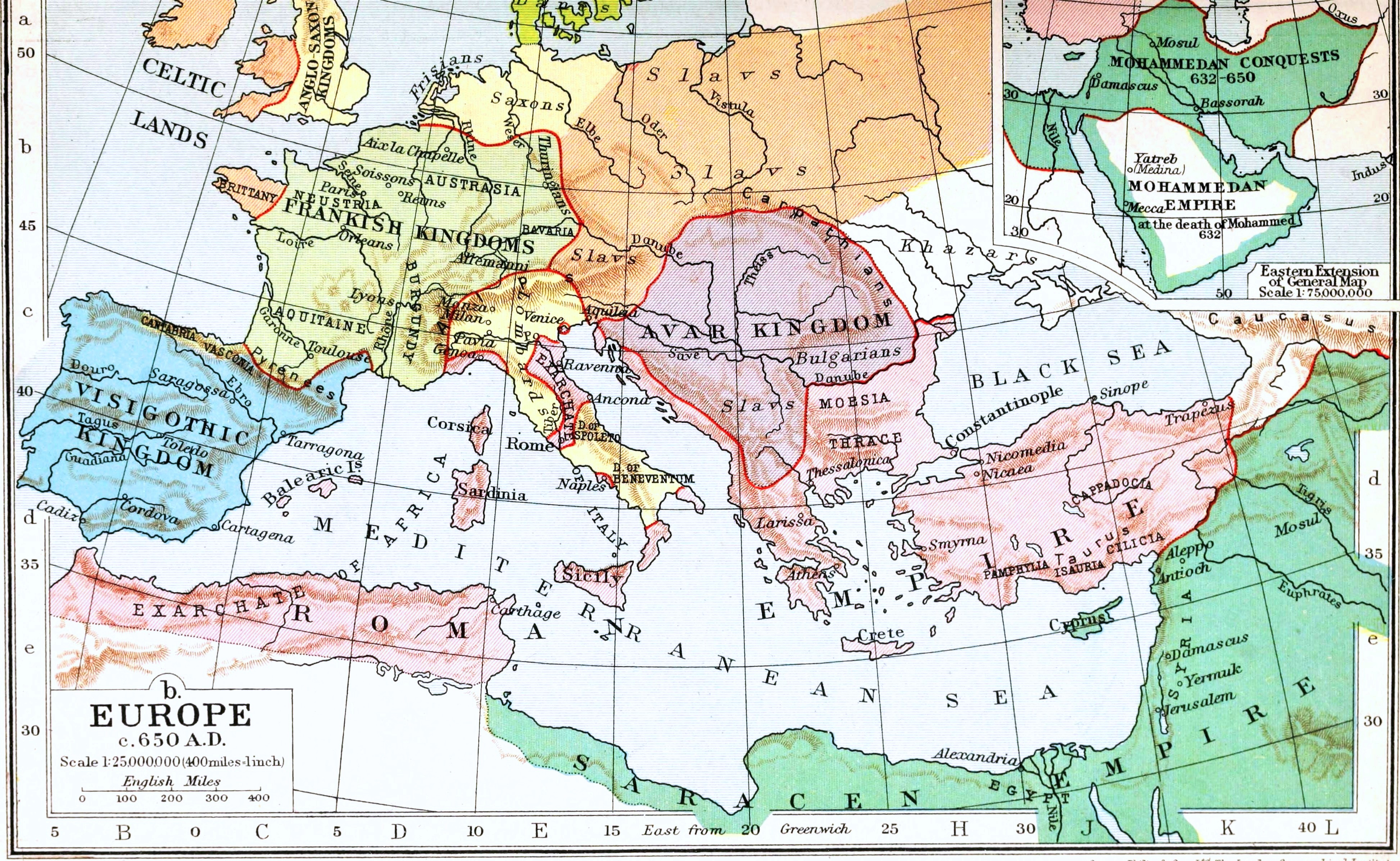
The Mediterranean world at the time of Gregory's rebellion

In 646, Gregory launched a rebellion against Constans. The obvious reason was the latter's support for Monotheletism, but it undoubtedly was also a reaction to the Muslim conquest of Egypt, and the threat it presented to Exarch of Africa. Given the failure of the imperial government in Constantinople to stop the Muslim advance, it was, in the words of Charles Diehl, "a great temptation for the powerful governor of Africa to secede from the feeble and remote empire that seemed incapable of defending its subjects". Doctrinal differences, as well as the long-established autonomy of the African exarchate, reinforced this tendency. The Arab chronicler al-Tabari on the other hand claims that Gregory's revolt was provoked by a levy of 300 pounds of gold demanded by Constans. Arab sources claim that after he was proclaimed emperor he minted coins with his own effigy, but none have so far been found. It seems that both Maximus the Confessor and Pope Theodore I encouraged or at least supported Gregory in this venture. Thus the Pope supposedly sent an envoy to convey a dream by Maximus, according to which two rival choirs of angels shouted "Victory to Constantine [Constans] Augustus" and "Victory to Gregory Augustus", with the former gradually falling silent and the latter winning out. The revolt seems to have found broad support among the populace as well, not only among the Romanized Africans, but also among the Berbers of the interior.

In 642–643, the Arabs seized Cyrenaica and the eastern half of Tripolitania, along with Tripoli. It was only an order from Caliph Umar (r. 634–644) that halted their westward expansion.

In 647, however, Umar's successor Uthman ordered Abdallah ibn Sa'ad to invade the Exarchate with 20,000 men. The Muslims invaded western Tripolitania and advanced up to the northern boundary of the Byzantine province of Byzacena. Gregory confronted the Arabs on their return at Sufetula, but amidst the battle he was assassinated, and his army subsequently defeated. Records from al-Bidayah wal Nihayah state that Abdullah's troops were completely surrounded by Gregory's army. However, Abdullah ibn Zubayr spotted Gregory in his chariot and asked Abdullah ibn Sa'ad to lead a small detachment to intercept him. The interception was successful, and Gregory was slain by Zubayr's ambush party. Consequently, the morale of Byzantine army started crumbling and soon they were routed. Agapius of Hierapolis and some Syriac sources claim that he survived the defeat and fled to Constantinople, where he was reconciled with Constans, but most modern scholars accept the Arab chroniclers' account of his death in battle. The Arab accounts also claim that the Muslims captured Gregory's daughter, who had fought at her father's side. She was being carried back to Egypt as captive, but she threw herself from the camel while on the march and died. After Gregory's death, the Arabs sacked Sufetula and raided across the Exarchate, while the Byzantines withdrew to their fortresses. Unable to storm the Byzantine fortifications, and satisfied with the huge amounts of plunder they had taken, the Arabs agreed to depart in exchange for the payment of a heavy tribute in gold.

Despite the fact that the Arab raid was not followed up for some time, and the restoration of ties with Constantinople, Byzantine rule over Africa was shaken to its roots by Gregory's rebellion and the Arab victory. The Berber tribes in particular shook off their allegiance to the Empire, and most of southern Tunisia seems to have slipped outside the control of Carthage. Thus the Battle of Sufetula marked "the end, more or less near, but inevitable, of Byzantine domination in Africa" (Diehl).

== Notes ==
Unknown Last known title holder: Heraclius the Elder	Exarch of Africa before 645 – 646	Succeeded by Gennadius
