= Battle of Sufetula (647) =

7th-century Arab-Byzantine conflict

- Part of the Muslim conquest of the Maghreb (Arab–Byzantine wars)
| Date | 647 |
| Location | Sufetula, North Africa 35°13′47″N 9°7′46″E |
| Result | Rashidun victory |

Belligerents
| Rashidun Caliphate | Byzantine Empire; Zenata and Maghrawa |

Commanders and leaders
| Abdallah ibn Sa'd; Abd Allah ibn al-Zubayr; Uqba ibn Nafi | Gregory the Patrician †; Wazmar ibn Saqlab (POW) |

Strength
| 20,000 men (Arab claim) | 120,000 men (Arab claim) |

Casualties and losses
| Unknown | Most of the army |
- Location within Tunisia

The Battle of Sufetula (Arabic: معركة سبيطلة, romanized: Ma'rakat Sbeitla) took place in 647 between the Arab Muslim forces of the Rashidun Caliphate and the Byzantine Exarchate of Africa.

== Background ==
The Exarchate of Africa was in internal turmoil due to the conflict between the mainly Orthodox Chalcedonian population and the supporters of Monotheletism, an attempt at compromise between Chalcedonianism and Monophysitism devised and promoted by Emperor Heraclius in 638.

In 642–643, the Arabs had seized Cyrenaica and the eastern half of Tripolitania, along with Tripoli. According to Ibn Abd al-Hakam, Amr ibn al-As captured Tripoli after seven of his soldiers from the clan of Madhlij, sub branch of Kinana, accidentally discovered a breach in its walls. The seven infiltrated the city and raised a disturbance; thinking that a much larger Muslim force had broken through their defenses, the Byzantine garrison fled and left Tripoli to Amr. It was only an order from Caliph Umar (r. 634–644) that halted their westward expansion.

In 646, the exarch Gregory the Patrician launched a rebellion against Emperor Constans II. The obvious reason was the latter's support for Monothelitism, but it undoubtedly was also a reaction to the Muslim conquest of Egypt, and the threat it presented to Byzantine Africa. The revolt seems to have found broad support among the populace as well, not only among the Romanized Africans, but also among the Berbers of the provincial hinterland.

== Battle ==
In 647, Umar's successor Uthman ordered Abdallah ibn Sa'ad to invade the Exarchate with 20,000 men. Muslim historians call this campaign "The Conquest of the Seven Abdallahs", after seven leaders named Abdallah; they are: Abdallah ibn Sa'd, Abdallah ibn Abbas, Abdallah ibn Ja'far, Abdallah ibn Umar, Abdallah ibn Amr, Abdallah ibn al-Zubayr, and Abdallah ibn Mas'ud. The Muslims invaded western Tripolitania and advanced up to the northern boundary of the Byzantine province of Byzacena. Gregory confronted the Arabs on their return at Sufetula. To encourage his soldiers, Gregory offered to marry his daughter, give her concubines, and raise position to anyone who succeeded in killing Abdallah. When Abdallah heard about this, he in turn promised to give his daughter to anyone who succeeded in killing Gregory. Records from al-Bidayah wal Nihayah state that Abdallah's troops were completely surrounded by Gregory's army. However, Abdallah ibn Zubayr spotted Gregory in his chariot and asked Abdallah ibn Sa'ad to lead a small detachment to intercept him. The interception was successful, and Gregory was slain by Zubayr's ambush party. Consequently, the morale of the Byzantine army started crumbling and soon they were routed.

Agapius of Hierapolis and some Syriac sources claim that he survived the defeat and fled to Constantinople, where he was reconciled with Constans, but most modern scholars accept the Arab chroniclers' account of his death in battle.

The Arab accounts also claim that the Muslims captured Gregory's daughter, who is named Amina, according to popular accounts. She was carried back to Egypt as captive, but she threw herself from the camel while on the march and died. Other accounts claim she was taken by Abdallah ibn al-Zubayr as Umm Walad, at the promise of Abdallah ibn Sa'd of giving her to whoever kills her father.

== Aftermath ==
After Gregory's death, the Arabs sacked Sufetula and raided across the Exarchate, while the Byzantines withdrew to their fortresses. Unable to storm the Byzantine fortifications, and satisfied with the huge amounts of plunder they had made, the Arabs agreed to depart in exchange for the payment of a heavy tribute in gold.

During this battle, Wazmar ibn Saqlab (or his son Sawlat), chief of Maghrawa and Zenata, was captured by the Muslims, and taken to Medina, where he converted to islam at the hands of caliph Uthman, and was appointed on his people and returned to his home, this led in the future to the Zenata and Maghrawa tribes being more inclined towards the Umayyads than the Abbasids.

Despite the fact that the Arab raid was not followed up for some time, and the restoration of ties with Constantinople, Byzantine rule over Africa was shaken to its roots by Gregory's rebellion and the Arab victory. The Berber tribes in particular shook off their allegiance to the Empire, and most of southern Tunisia seems to have slipped outside the control of Carthage. Thus the Battle of Sufetula marked "the end, more or less near, but inevitable, of Byzantine domination in Africa".

== Bibliography ==
- Charles Diehl (1896), L'Afrique byzantine: histoire de la domination byzantine en Afrique (533-709) (in French), Paris
- Denys Pringle (1981), The defence of Byzantine Africa from Justinian to the Arab conquest: an account of the military history and archaeology of the African provinces in the sixth and seventh centuries, B.A.R., ISBN 978-0-86054-119-6
