= Nicetas (cousin of Heraclius) =

Byzantine general

- Died: after 618/9, possibly 628/9; Constantinople? (modern-day Istanbul, Turkey)
- Children: Gregoria; Nicetas?; Gregory the Patrician?
- Relatives: Heraclius (cousin); Gregoras (father)
- Military career
- Allegiance: Heraclius the Elder and Heraclius the Younger
- Branch: Byzantine army
- Service years: 608–618/9
- Conflicts: Rebellion against Phocas; Conquest of the Cyrenaica and Egypt; Byzantine–Sasanian War of 602–628; Battle of Antioch (613); Battle of the Cilician Gates (613); Battle of Adhri'at (614); Battle of Emesa (614?); Sasanian conquest of Egypt
- Memorials: Statues in Constantinople

Nicetas or Niketas (Greek: Νικήτας, romanized: Nikétas) was the cousin of Emperor Heraclius. He played a major role in the revolt against Phocas that brought Heraclius to the throne, where he captured Egypt for his cousin. Nicetas remained governor of Egypt (or at least Alexandria) thereafter, and participated also in the Byzantine–Sassanid War of 602–628, but failed to stop the Sassanid conquest of Egypt ca. 618/619. He disappears from the sources thereafter, but possibly served as Exarch of Africa until his death.

== Rebellion against Phocas and the conquest of Egypt ==
Nicetas was the son of the patrikios Gregoras, the brother of the Exarch of Africa Heraclius the Elder, under whom he served as magister militum in Africa. When Heraclius the Elder launched a rebellion against the usurper Phocas in 608, Nicetas and his father supported it. The Exarch's son, Heraclius the Younger, was the rebellion's candidate to replace Phocas, and with a fleet sailed directly for the imperial capital, Constantinople, which he seized on 5 October 610. At the same time, Nicetas, his forces augmented by Berber auxiliaries, undertook the overland conquest of the Cyrenaica and Egypt. The 9th-century Patriarch of Constantinople Nikephoros reports that the two cousins were involved in a "race" for Constantinople and the imperial throne, but this is clearly a legend.

Nicetas' cause was aided by dissatisfied factions within Egypt itself, including the former prefect of Alexandria Theodore and his sons, probably the very wealthy and powerful Egyptian family of the Apiones, and even by prophecies and portents spread by holy men who opposed Phocas' tyranny. Cyrenaica fell easily, and Nicetas' deputy Bonakis was sent against Egypt with 3,000 Byzantines and many more Berber auxiliaries. According to the account of John of Nikiu, the prefect of the Mareotis was bribed to switch sides, and in a battle before Alexandria, Nicetas' forces defeated and killed Phocas' general. The city's populace rose up in support of Nicetas' forces, the Patriarch, governor and treasurer fled, and Nicetas had the populace proclaim his cousin as emperor.

Bonakis was then dispatched to complete the conquest of the Nile Delta, but two garrisons, at Semanub and Athrib, resisted until Phocas sent a general, Bonosus, from Palestine to recover Egypt. Bonosus was initially successful, as he defeated, captured and executed Bonakis and seized Nikiu, where he executed several leading figures who had supported the rebellion. In the meantime, Alexandria was plagued by factional fighting between the Blues, who still supported Phocas, and the Greens, who supported the rebellion, but before long the Blues switched sides, and Nicetas was able to raise new troops and repel two attempts by Bonosus to capture the city. Dismayed, Bonosus retreated and eventually took ship from Pelusium to Constantinople. Following his departure, the Heraclians consolidated their control of Egypt, a process which was completed by the summer of 610.

== Governorship of Egypt and the Persian war ==
From Egypt, Nicetas apparently marched on into Palestine to subdue the Phocas loyalists there, but soon returned to Egypt, where he was installed as governor. His exact office is unclear—he is usually simply mentioned by his rank of patrikios, which he probably was given in 610—but he was possibly dux et augustalis of Alexandria. As Walter Kaegi comments, in view of the mutual trust between Nicetas and Heraclius, this made eminent sense, since Egypt contributed some 30% of the praetorian prefecture of the East's annual income, and the new regime "would not have wished some other politically ambitious figure to stir up new unrest there as they had recently done themselves". At Egypt, Nicetas sponsored the election of John the Almsgiver as Patriarch of Alexandria, with whom he even became a ritual brother through the rite of adelphopoiesis.

Later, in 615 or 616, he helped reconcile the Monophysite churches of Alexandria and Antioch, but it is unclear whether Nicetas remained continuously in office; at any rate, he was absent from Egypt for several extended periods. Thus in the summer of 612 he visited Constantinople, where he was received with great pomp. According to the Chronicon Paschale, he brought with him the Holy Sponge and the Holy Lance, which were the objects of special services held at the capital in autumn. Heraclius reportedly left control of the capital to Nicetas when he went to Cappadocia to meet Priscus, who was besieging the Sassanid Persians in Caesarea. During this time, according to the hagiography of Saint Theodore of Sykeon, Nicetas reputedly fell ill and was healed through the intercession of the saint. When Priscus was disgraced shortly after, on 5 December 612 Nicetas succeeded him as comes excubitorum, commander of the imperial bodyguard.

In 613, Nicetas accompanied Heraclius in his campaign against the Persians, but the two cousins were defeated in the Battle of Antioch by Shahin Vahmanzadegan, a defeat which resulted in the rapid fall of Syria to the Persians. It appears, however, that Nicetas managed to win a costly victory near Emesa, possibly in 614. It is probably on this occasion that statues honouring him were erected in Constantinople. The Persian victories and the shortage of funds forced Nicetas to turn to his friend, the Patriarch John, for help, and requisition funds from the Alexandrian Church.

Following the conquest of Syria and Palestine, the Persian general Shahrbaraz began the invasion of Egypt. Nicetas' role in preparing for and during the defence of the province, as well as the detailed course of the invasion, are unknown, but both he and Patriarch John fled Alexandria for Cyprus and then Rhodes, shortly before its fall to the Persians.

Nicetas disappears from sources after this, but based on a later anecdote it has been suggested by Charles Diehl that he went on to govern Africa until his probable death in 628/9. Other scholars, however, including the editors of the Prosopography of the Later Roman Empire, consider this interpretation unlikely.

== Family ==
Nicetas was the father of the Empress Gregoria, wife of Constantine III, and perhaps also of a patrikios Nicetas, attested in 639, and of the Exarch of Africa Gregory.

== Notes ==
a: According to the reinterpretation proposed by Holger A. Klein in "Niketas und das wahre Kreuz", Byzantinische Zeitschrift Vol. 94 (2001), pp. 580–587, whose arguments are accepted by Walter Kaegi in his 2003 biography of Heraclius, the patrikios Nicetas who brought these two relics to Constantinople was not the cousin of Heraclius as traditionally believed, but rather the namesake baptized son of the Persian general Shahrbaraz, who had seized the relics along with the True Cross when he captured Jerusalem, and returned them in 629, after the end of the Byzantine–Sassanid war.

== Sources ==
- Kaegi, Walter Emil (1991). "Niketas". In Kazhdan, Alexander (ed.). The Oxford Dictionary of Byzantium. Oxford and New York: Oxford University Press. p. 1480. ISBN 0-19-504652-8.
- Kaegi, Walter Emil (2003). Heraclius: emperor of Byzantium. Cambridge University Press. ISBN 0-521-81459-6.
- Martindale, John R., ed. (1992). The Prosopography of the Later Roman Empire: Volume III, AD 527–641. Cambridge: Cambridge University Press. ISBN 0-521-20160-8.
