= Imperial overstretch =

Phenomenon in international relations concerning the limits of hard power

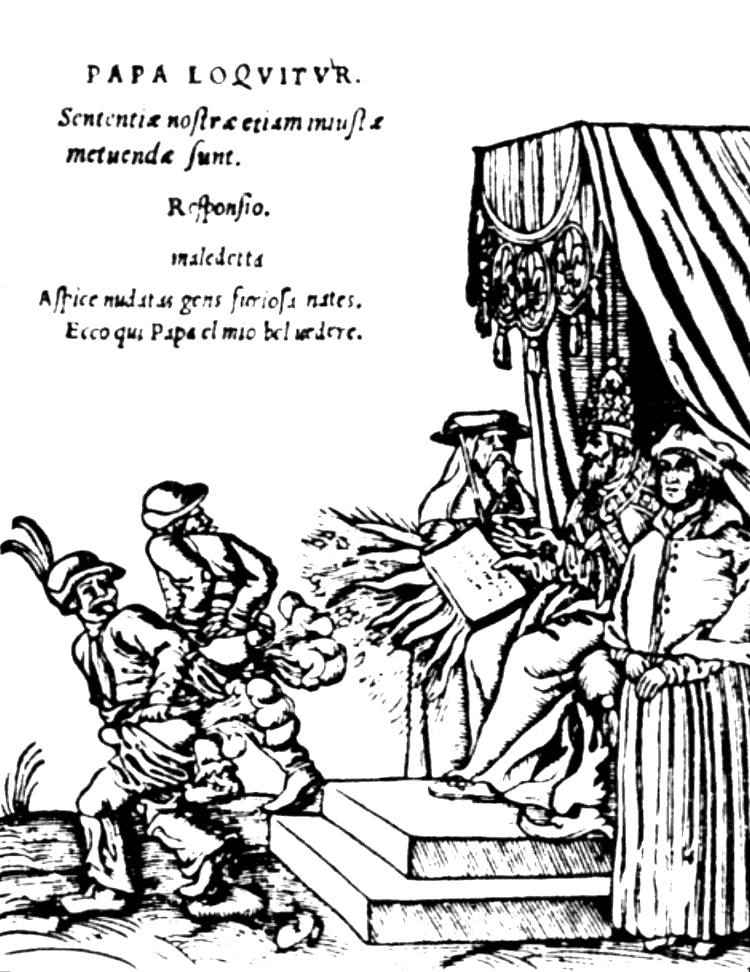
One example of Imperial overstretch was when the papacy, preoccupied with expanding the Papal States, allowed the Reformation to escalate beyond its control, as illustrated in a series of woodcuts (1545) usually referred to as the Papstspotbilder or Papstspottbilder (English: 'mocking depictions of the Pope'), by Lucas Cranach, commissioned by Martin Luther. Title: Kissing the Pope's Feet. German peasants respond to a papal bull of Pope Paul III. Caption reads: "Don't frighten us Pope, with your ban, and don't be such a furious man. Otherwise we shall turn around and show you our rears."

Imperial overstretch, also known as imperial overreach, describes the situation in which an empire extends itself beyond its military-economic capabilities and often collapses as a result. The idea was popularised by Yale University historian Paul Kennedy in his 1987 book The Rise and Fall of the Great Powers. In his 1976 book The Rise and Fall of British Naval Mastery Kennedy quoted B. H. Liddell Hart as using the phrase "strategical overstretch" in reference to the British Empire. The idea was expanded upon by Jack Snyder in his 1991 book Myths of Empire.

== Description ==
According to Jack Snyder, imperial overstretch happens when notions that security can best be achieved through imperial expansion guide policymakers. Snyder refers to these ideas as "myths of empire", as they tend to be counterproductive.

Paul Kennedy's view has been criticised from many directions, including by the postmodern historiographer Hayden White, economic historian Niall Ferguson and Marxist writers such as Perry Anderson.

== Historical examples ==
Arguably, this was true of the Roman Empire, which was strong and effective in the first and early second centuries CE, despite a few setbacks (Germany in 9 CE; Scotland in the 80s CE) but lost territories after that (e.g. Dacia and Mesopotamia) and could not keep the Saxons, Huns and other "barbarians" out in the 4th and 5th centuries.

It was also true of the Napoleonic Empire, which made rapid gains by conquest in the first decade after Napoleon became emperor of France, but became over-extended militarily when it attempted to conquer Russia in 1812.

Likewise the principal three Axis powers all overextended themselves during World War II: Nazi Germany, waging war since 1939 in Western and Eastern Europe, was encircled, invaded, and fell in 1945; Imperial Japan led a total war in China and the Pacific Ocean; and fascist Italy, opening in 1940 simultaneous fronts in Africa, the Balkans, and the Mediterranean, suffered setbacks and fell in 1943.

== See also ==
- Societal collapse
