= Gennadius (magister militum Africae) =

- Rank: magister militum

Gennadius (Greek: Γεννάδιος, romanized: Gennádios, fl. 578–600) was an East Roman (Byzantine) general and the first exarch of Africa.

== Biography ==
Gennadius was appointed as magister militum Africae in c. 578, and quickly defeated the Romano-Moorish kingdom of Garmul in Mauretania. He held this post until named exarch by Emperor Maurice (r. 582–602) sometime between 585 and 591. Already a patricius by 582, he was awarded the title of honorary consul sometime before 585. As exarch, he had an extensive correspondence with Pope Gregory the Great on issues of the African Church, and especially the suppression of the Donatists. Gennadius suppressed a series of Moorish revolts in c. 585 and c. 596, and retired from his post sometime between September/October 598 and July 600. He was succeeded by Innocentius as a civilian praetorian prefect of Africa.

== Sources ==
- Martindale, John R., ed. (1992). The Prosopography of the Later Roman Empire: Volume III, AD 527–641. Cambridge: Cambridge University Press. ISBN 0-521-20160-8.
