= Charles Diehl =

French historian (1859–1944)

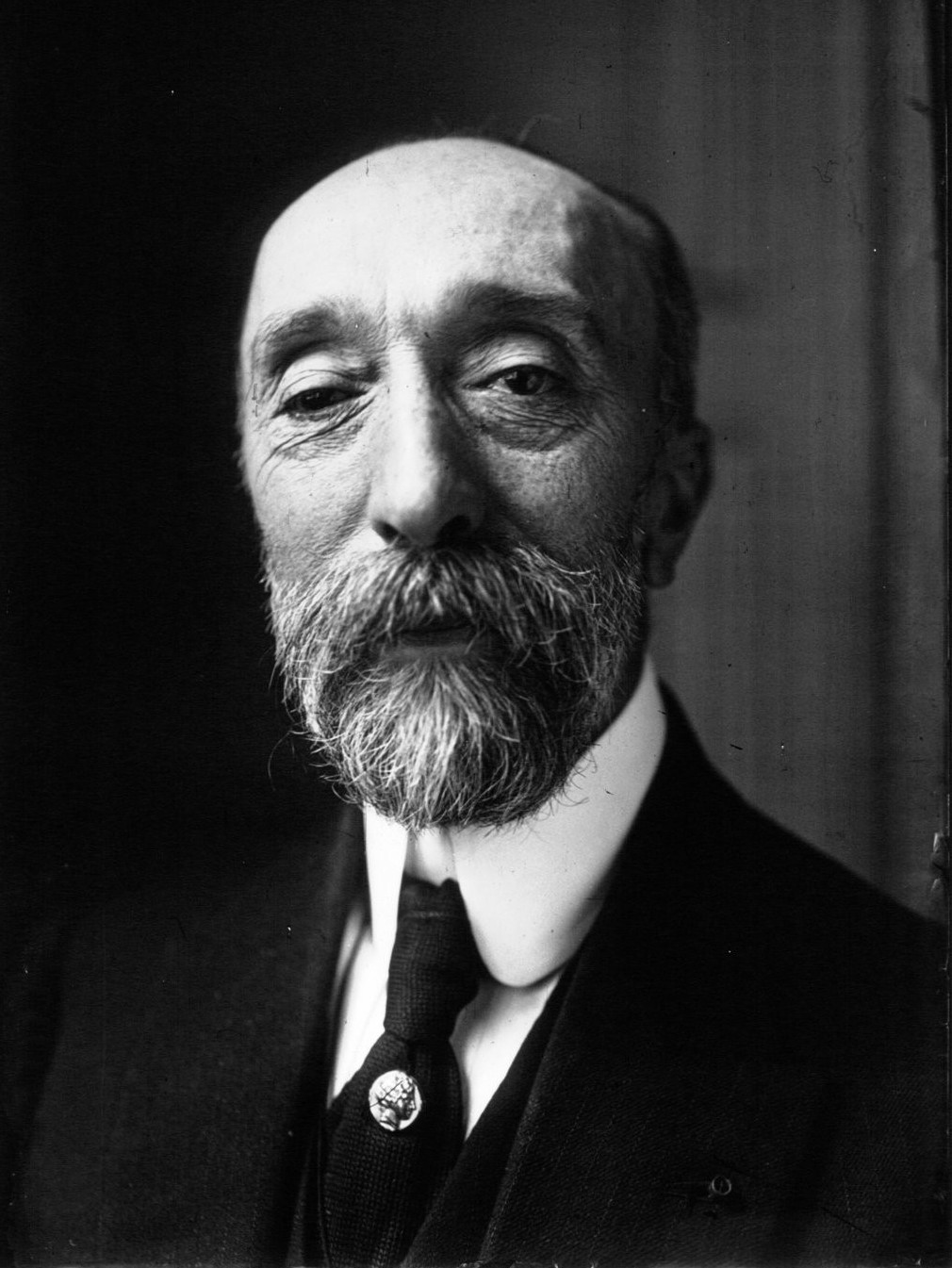
Charles Diehl (1922)

Charles Diehl (French: [dil]; 19 January 1859 – 1 November 1944) was a French historian born in Strasbourg. He was a leading authority on Byzantine art and history.

== Biography ==
He received his education at the École Normale Supérieure, and later taught classes on Byzantine history at the Sorbonne. He was member of the École française de Rome (1881–1883) and the École française d'Athènes. In 1910, he became a member of the Académie des inscriptions et belles-lettres (elected president in 1921).

He died in Paris.

== Legacy ==
The Karolou Dil Street in the city of Thessaloniki (Greece) was named after Charles Diehl. The street is located near the Byzantine church of Hagia Sophia that was restored by him between 1907 and 1909.

== Honours and awards ==
=== Honorary degrees ===
- Harvard University
- Université libre de Bruxelles
- University of Belgrade
- University of Bucharest
- National and Kapodistrian University of Athens

=== Prizes ===
- Montyon Prize (1981)
- Marcelin-Guérin Prize (1907)
- Grand Prix of the Académie Française (1944)

=== Acknowledgement ===
- Member of the Académie des inscriptions et belles-lettres
- Member of the Medieval Academy of America
- Member of the Serbian Academy of Sciences and Arts
- Member of the Russian Academy of Sciences
- Associate Member of the Real Academia de la Historia
- Associate Member of the Romanian Academy

=== Honours ===
- Grand officier of the Legion of Honour (1939)

== Selected works ==
Diehl was the author of several influential books on Byzantine art and history. His treatise "Byzance. Grandeur et décadence" was translated into English by Naomi Walford and published in 1957 as "Byzantium: Greatness and Decline".

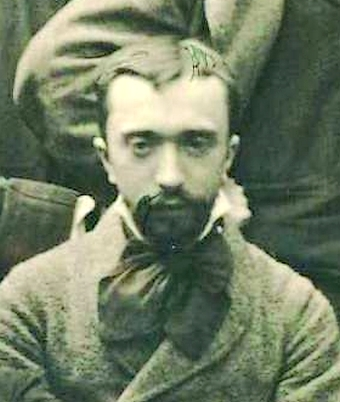
Charles Diehl (1878)

Other published works by Diehl include:

- 1890: Excursions archéologiques en Grèce – Archaeological excursions in Greece.
- 1896: L'Art byzantin dans L'Italie méridionale – Byzantine art in southern Italy.
- 1896: L'Afrique byzantine. Histoire de la domination byzantine en Afrique (533–709) – Byzantine Africa; history of Byzantine domination in Africa 533–709.
- 1901: Justinien et la Civilisation byzantine au 6. Siècle – Justinian I and the Byzantine civilization of the 6th century.
- 1904: Theodora, Imperatrice de Byzance – Theodora, Empress of Byzantium.
- 1906–1908: Figures Byzantines – Byzantine figures.
- 1910: Manuel d'art byzantin – Manual of Byzantine art.
- 1920: Histoire de l'empire byzantin – History of the Byzantine Empire.
- 1928: L'Art chrétien primitif et l'art byzantin – Early Christian art and Byzantine art.
- 1933: La Peinture byzantine – Byzantine paintings.
- 1943: Les Grands Problèmes de l'Histoire Byzantine – The main problems of Byzantine history.
