= Umayyad rule in North Africa =

Umayyad province

- Province of Umayyad Caliphate
- 661–747
- Capital: Kairouan
- History
  - First Fitna: 661
  - Takeover by the Fihrids during the Abbasid Revolution: 747
Preceded by	Succeeded by
Rashidun Caliphate; Exarchate of Africa	Fihrids

The Umayyad Caliphate (661–750) ruled the Maghreb region of North Africa, from its conquest of the Maghreb starting in 661 to the Kharijite Berber Revolt ending in 743, which led to the end of its rule in the western and central Maghreb. Following this period, the Umayyads retained their rule over Ifriqiya (later fell to the Abbasid Caliphate) while the rest of the Maghreb fell to successive Islamic dynasties of Arab, Berber and Persian descent.

== History ==
=== Conquest and expansion ===
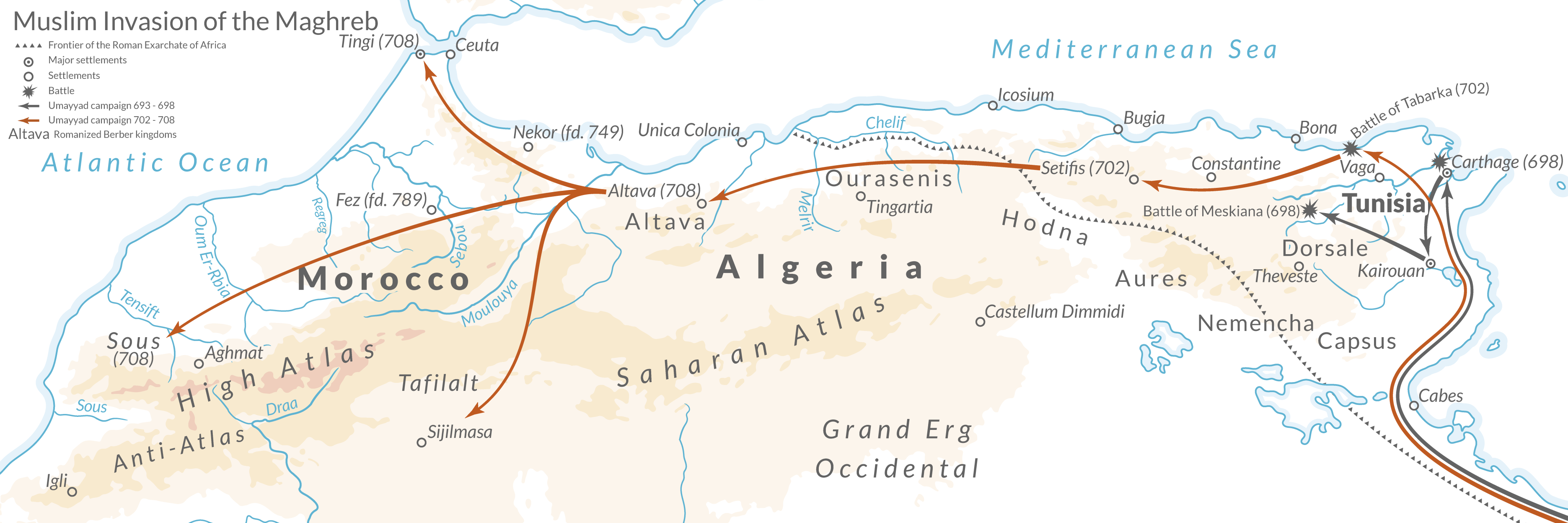
Map of the Muslim conquest of the Maghreb

The Muslim conquest of the Maghreb began in 647 under the Rashidun Caliphate, which used Egypt as a base to conquer the Maghreb. Abdallah ibn Sa'd led the invasion with 20,000 soldiers from Medina in the Arabian Peninsula, swiftly taking over Tripolitania and then defeating a much larger Byzantine army at the Battle of Sufetula in the same year. However, the Arab troops withdrew after the new Exarch of Africa agreed to pay tribute in exchange. Upon conquering Cyrenaica in 642 or 643, Amr ibn al-As fixed the jizyah to be paid by its Berber tribes at 13,000 dinars. He also demanded from the Lawata tribe that they should sell to the Arabs a number of their 'sons and daughters' to the value of their share of the total jizyah.

After the First Fitna and establishment of the Umayyad Caliphate in 661 by Mu'awiya I, a second invasion of the Maghreb began. An army of 10,000 Muslims and thousands of others, led by the Arab general Uqba ibn Nafi, departed from Damascus and marched into Africa, conquering it. In 670, the city of Kairouan was established as a base for further operations and capital city of the North African province. The Great Mosque of Kairouan was founded in the same year.

The Umayyads were faced with resistance from Berber forces led by Kahina and Kusaila in the 680s, who opposed the advancing Islamic armies of the Umayyad Caliphate. Kusaila managed to ambush an Umayyad army and kill Uqba ibn Nafi at the Battle of Vescera in 682. However, Hassan ibn al-Nu'man and Musa ibn Nusayr later defeated both Berber leaders, killing Kusaila at the Battle of Mamma (688) and killing Dihya at the Battle of Tabarka (702), leading to the subjugation of the Berber tribes. The Battle of Carthage in 698 contributed to the recapture of the city by the Umayyads.

Increasing Arab migration towards the end of the 7th century finally overcame Berber and Byzantine resistance, gradually converting the Berbers to Islam and incorporating the entire Maghreb into the Umayyad Caliphate. During the conquest, Arab migrants peacefully arrived as peaceful newcomers and were warmly received in all regions of the Maghreb. Numerous large Arab communities were established across various areas, with a significant number of settlers hailing from the Najdi tribe of Banu Tamim.

=== Policies ===
In 698, Musa ibn Nusayr was appointed governor of Ifriqiya, as the first governor not under the authority of the governor of the province of Egypt. He was made responsible for completing the conquest of the Maghreb, the Balearic Islands and Sardinia. His troops occupied Tangiers, effectively occupying all of the northern half of modern-day Morocco, and then conquered Sous. In 711, the Umayyad conquest of Spain was launched by Tariq ibn Ziyad from territory in North Africa, establishing full control over the Iberian Peninsula and the province of Al-Andalus by 726. During his term as governor of Ifriqiya, Musa ibn Nusayr raided Berber settlements and took captives, who were treated as war booty and taken into slavery in the Umayyad Caliphate. The Umayyad caliph's share of captured Berber slaves amounted to 20,000.

Ismail ibn Abd Allah ibn Abi al-Muhajir was appointed governor of Ifriqiya in 718. He encouraged the Berbers to convert to Islam and curbed the abuses of the Arab military caste. Ismail adhered to Sharia Islamic law and eliminated extraordinary taxes and slave-tributes on Berber populations. He is credited for completing the conversion of the Berber population to Islam. His successor Yazid ibn Abi Muslim, who became governor in 720, re-imposed the jizyah on Berbers and expanded other taxes and tributes. He also tattooed the hands of the Berber guard of Kairouan with their personal names on their right hand and the phrase "Guard of Yazid" on their left hand. He was assassinated in 721.

As a result of dhimmi taxation and slave-tributes, the resentful Berber population started to consider radical Kharijite activists from the East, especially the Sufrites and Ibadites, which began to arrive in the Maghreb since the 720s. The Kharijites preached a strict form of Islam, promising a new political order, where all Muslims would be equal regardless of ethnicity or tribal status.

Bishr ibn Safwan al-Kalbi was appointed governor by the new caliph, Hisham ibn Abd al-Malik. Bishr sent off his commanders on frequent campaigns against Byzantine targets in the Mediterranean Sea. Umayyad Ifriqiyan forces attacked Sardinia in 721 and 727, and attacked both Sardinia and Corsica in 724. Raids against unknown objectives were carried out in 722 and 726. Bishr personally led an expedition against Sicily which resulted in the acquisition of loot and goods, but this offensive ended badly when storms overtook his fleet and killed a great amount of his army.

The Umayyad Caliphate was aware of the importance of the importance of the spread and settlement of Arabs in the Maghreb. Umayyad Caliph Hisham ibn Abd al-Malik swore that he would send a large army and added "I will not leave a single Berber compound without pitching beside it a tent of a tribesman from Qays or Tamim".

=== Berber revolt ===
Frustrated by Umayyad taxation, Maysara al-Matghari and his Kharijite Berber forces rose up in a Berber revolt against the caliphate. His coalition of Berber armies took over the city of Tangier. This surprised the Umayyad governor in Kairouan, Ubayd Allah ibn al-Habhab, who dispatched Khalid ibn Abi Habib al-Fihri to Tangier to keep the Berber rebels contained, while awaiting Habib ibn Abi Obeida al-Fihri's return from Sicily and shipping of the Ifriqiyan army back to North Africa. After a brief skirmish with the Arab column, Maysara ordered the Berber armies to retreat to Tangier. The Arab cavalry commander Khalid ibn Abi Habiba did not pursue them, but just held his line south of Tangier, blockading the Berber-held city.

After the clashes, Berber tribal leaders deposed and executed Maysara and replaced him with a new leader, Khalid ibn Hamid al-Zanati. The new leader immediately decided to attack the idling Ifriqiyan column before they could be reinforced. They defeated the Ifriqiyan army at the Battle of the Nobles in c. October–November 740. In February, 741, the Umayyad Caliph Hisham ibn Abd al-Malik appointed Kulthum ibn Iyad al-Qasi to replace Ubayd Allah ibn al-Habhab as governor of Ifriqiya. Kulthum was to be accompanied by an Arab army of 30,000 (27,000 from Syria and 3,000 from Egypt), however this army was defeated by the Berbers at the Battle of Bagdoura.

Immediately after hearing of this, Caliph Hisham ibn Abd al-Malik ordered the governor of Egypt, Handhala ibn Safwan al-Kalbi, to take control in Ifriqiya. In February 742, Handhala ibn Safwan reached Kairouan around April 742. Another threat rose when the two Berber rebel leaders Uqasha ibn Ayub al-Fezari and Abd al-Wahid ibn Yazid al-Hawwari agreed on a joint attack on Kairouan. Abd al-Wahid alone had a force of 300,000 troops.

Hearing of the approach of the Berber armies, Handhala ibn Safwan dispatched a cavalry force to harass and slow down Abd al-Wahid's armies in the north, and dispatched the bulk of his forces south, heavily defeating Uqasha at the Battle of al-Qarn and taking him prisoner. Handhala returned north and crushed the 300,000 strong army of Abd al-Wahid. The decisive Battle of al-Asnam led to the death of Abd al-Wahid and around 120,000 to 180,000 Berbers, though historian Khalid Yahya Blankinship states that this figure is an exaggeration not to be trusted even in a vague way, as it may have been invented by the caliphal tradition to counterbalance the earlier record of utter failure in the Berber war.

The revolt simultaneously occurred in al-Andalus ending in a failure. however the Berber armies in North Africa were able secure their hold on the western and central Maghreb even after the failure to seize Ifriqiya and Kairouan, leading to the establishment of several independent states.

=== Fihrid seizure of power and aftermath ===
In 747, during the Abbasid Revolution against the Umayyad Caliphate, the Fihrid clan (descendants of Uqba ibn Nafi) took advantage of the situation and seized power in Ifriqiya. They controlled all of present-day Tunisia, except for the southern parts, which were under the influence of the independent Warfajuma Berber tribe, who were associated with the Sufri Kharijites. The Fihrids continued to rule the region until 756, when Ifriqiya came under the rule of the Warfajuma, and then the rule of the Ibadiyyah of Tripolitania in 758. In 761, the Abbasid Caliphate conquered the region from the ruling Ibadites and established direct rule there.

== Governance ==
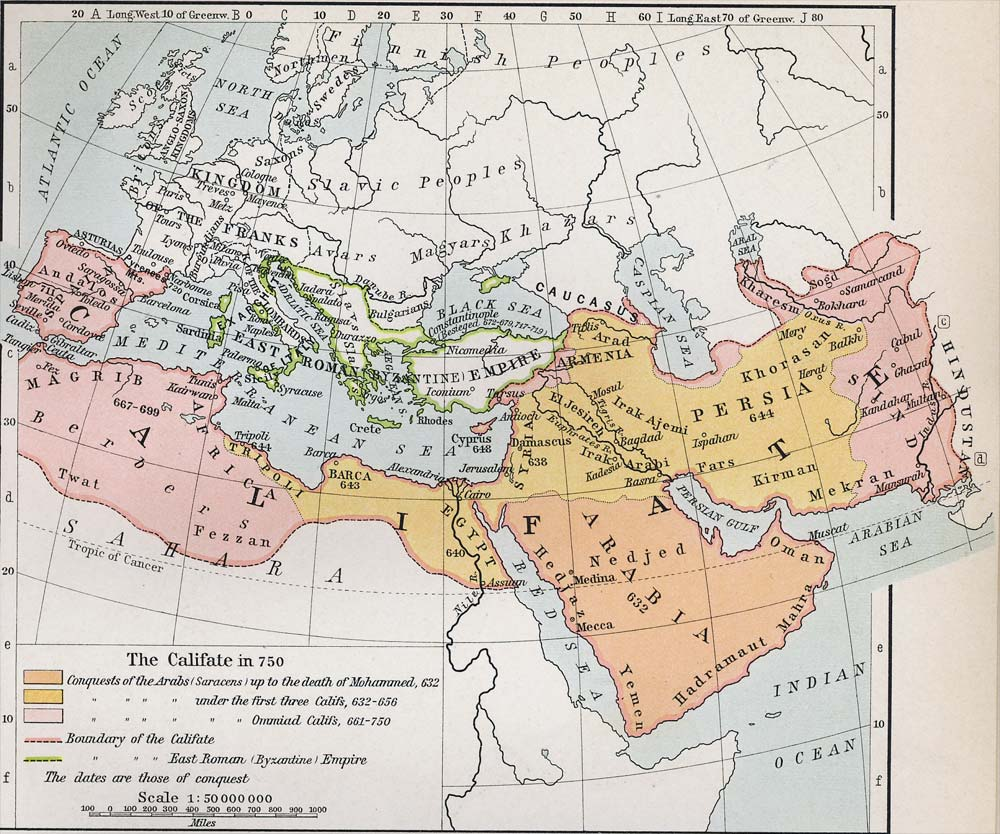
Map of the expansion of the Umayyad Caliphate

The conquest of the Maghreb led by Hassan ibn al-Nu'man and Musa ibn Nusayr established a new province that covered more than five times the land area of Byzantine Africa. This vast territory extended from the Atlantic Ocean in the west to the Western Desert in the east, and from the Mediterranean Sea in the north to the deep oases of the Sahara in the south. Due to its large size, it was divided into Ifriqiya, Tripolitania, Zab, and Sus, which were governed by 'amils (sub-governors), and were further subdivided into districts (kuras) and cantons (rustaqs), each with their own commander. Following the model of the Eastern provinces, the Maghreb was governed by a wali (governor) appointed by the Umayyad caliph from the capital of Damascus.

=== Taxation ===
As soon as Carthage fell to the Umayyads in 698, taxation was imposed. Hassan ibn al-Nu'man established the diwan and imposed the Kharaj Islamic tax on the town-dwellers of Ifriqiya and all remaining Christian Berbers. Yazid ibn Abi Muslim, who became governor of Ifriqiya in 720, re-imposed the jizyah on the Berber populations and expanded other taxes and tributes.

=== Currency ===
Immediately after the Umayyads captured Carthage in 698, Umayyad coins began to be minted. In 718–719, Latin inscriptions and dates were finally replaced by Arabic. Like Egypt and the Levant, North Africa operated with a Byzantine-style gold-standard currency, however this was eventually abandoned and replaced by a new Umayyad design. The new design rejected all imagery and used political and religious inscriptions in Arabic instead. This became the model of Islamic coinage for several hundred years.

=== Slavery ===
Ibn Abd al-Hakam recounts that the Arab General Hassan ibn al-Nu'man would often abduct "young, female Berber slaves of unparalleled beauty, some of which were worth a thousand dinars." Al-Hakam confirms that up to one hundred thousand slaves were captured by Musa ibn Nusayr and his son and nephew during the conquest of North Africa. In Tangier, Musa enslaved all the Berber inhabitants. Musa sacked a fortress near Kairouan and took with him all the children as slaves. The number of Berbers enslaved "amounted to a number never before heard of in any of the countries subject to the rule of Islam" up to that time. As a result, "most of the African cities were depopulated, [and] the fields remained without cultivation." Even so, Musa "never ceased pushing his conquests until he arrived before Tangiers, the citadel of their [Berbers’] country and the mother of their cities, which he also besieged and took, obliging its inhabitants to embrace Islam."

It is also sometimes mentioned that a constant tribute in slaves, particularly girls, was sent to the caliph and indeed, al Tabari asserts that the most beautiful Berber girls were taken arbitrarily to be slaves although they were Muslims.

== Military ==
The Umayyads controlled the vast territory of North Africa through a military force of 50,000 Arabian soldiers, who were given land grants. This urban-based Arab military aristocracy was one of the most significant in the region, however they frequently revolted against the authorities. During the Umayyad conquest, 40,000 Arab troops from Egypt were brought in. The South Arabian Qahtanite tribal groups had been the most numerous during this period. Due to the great influx of men during the Abbasid period, primarily Khurasani Arab troops from Iraq, the ethnic makeup and tribal balance of Ifriqiya was shifted, in which the North Arabian Adnanite tribes such as Banu Tamim became the majority in the army.

Berbers began to enter the army once they were Islamized and Arabized. The Berbers were the only people to be incorporated into the Umayyad armies and to have converted to Islam on such a large scale. Hassan ibn al-Nu'man made agreements with some Berber tribes and took 12,000 of them into his army. Musa ibn Nusayr is said to have instructed Berber troops into Islam as early as 708. Members of the Christian population also joined the army, such as Roman Africans including the convert Abd al-Rahman al-Hubuli.

== Arab immigration ==
In the Maghreb in the seventh and early eighth centuries, there were about 50,000 men from the Arabian Peninsula who first served in Egypt. These became a hereditary ruling class primarily made up of the conquerors and their descendants with very few outsiders. Land grants were given to some of these soldiers, creating a landed Arab aristocracy with extensive landholdings, cultivated in many cases by slaves from sub-Saharan Africa. An example of these were the Fihrids, descendants of Uqba ibn Nafi, who occupied a privileged position in Ifriqiyan and Andalusi society. There were other powerful Arab settlers who briefly appeared in the sources, especially those of Qurayshi ancestry. Arab settlers mostly settled in cities, such as Kairouan, until the migration of the nomadic Banu Hilal and Banu Sulaym in the 11th century.

Increasing Arab migration towards the end of the 7th century finally overcame Berber and Byzantine resistance, gradually converting the Berbers to Islam and incorporating the entire Maghreb into the Umayyad Caliphate. Throughout the period of conquest, Arab migrants settled in all parts of the Maghreb, coming as peaceful newcomers and were welcomed everywhere. Large Arab settlements were established in many areas in Cyrenaica and Ifriqiya. A considerable portion of the Arab settlers belonged to the Najdi tribe of Banu Tamim. Arabians arrived in the Maghreb in large numbers after an expedition by the Banu Muzaina tribe to the Maghreb under the leadership of Zayd ibn Haritha al-Kalbi in the 7th-8th century.

The Arab Muslim conquerors had a much more durable impact on the culture of the Maghreb than did the region's conquerors before and after them, and by the 11th century, the Berbers had become Islamized and Arabized.

== Architecture ==
Kairouan was founded in 670 by the Umayyad general Uqba ibn Nafi as the capital city of the new province. Uqba chose the site for its first mosque, and the Great Mosque of Kairouan was constructed on the same year. Ten years after the Great Mosque of Damascus was completed, the Umayyad caliph ordered the Kairouan Mosque to be enlarged in 724 to accommodate the growing Muslim population of Kairouan. The old structure except the mihrab was demolished, and the new mosque was enlarged to four times the original size. This mosque has served as a model of all later mosques in the Maghreb, and is considered one of the masterpieces of Islamic architecture.

In 686, Sidi Uqba Mosque was built as a mausoleum dedicated to Uqba ibn Nafi after his death in an ambush by Berber and Byzantine forces at the Battle of Vescera in 682. The building was at first built in a simple manner, completely made out of limestone mortars, with no precious materials used. This architectural style resembled early Islamic architecture.

Tunis was built in 698 as the main harbour and district capital of the north. The Medina of Tunis, the oldest section of the city, dates from this period. Al-Zaytunah Mosque was built in 114 Hijri (c. 731 CE) by Ubayd Allah ibn al-Habhab, as the second mosque to be built in the Maghreb after the Kairouan Mosque.
