= Uqba ibn Nafi =

Arab Muslim general (died 683)

ʿUqba ibn Nāfiʿ عقبة بن نافع
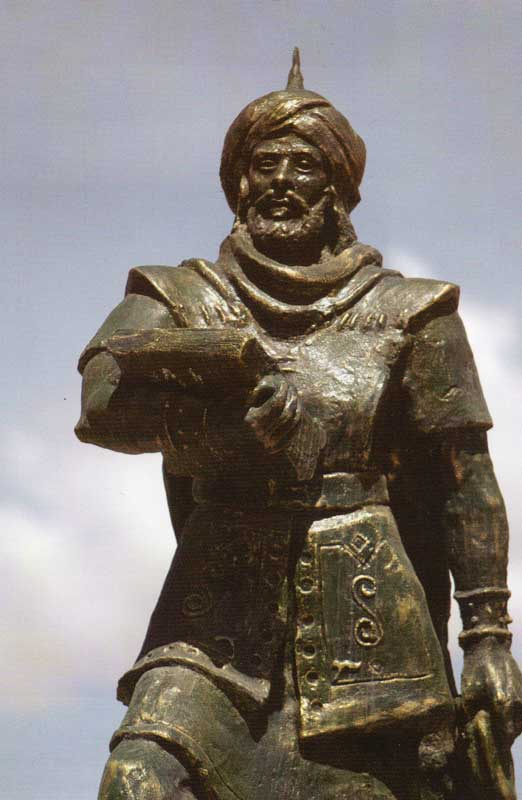
- A statue of Uqba bin Nafi in Algeria

Governor of Ifriqiya
- In office 666–674
- Monarch: Mu'awiya I
- Preceded by: Mu'awiya ibn Hudayj
- Succeeded by: Abu al-Muhajir Dinar
- In office 681–683
- Monarch: Yazid I
- Succeeded by: Abu al-Muhajir Dinar
- Succeeded by: Zuhayr ibn Qays

Personal details
- Born: 622 Mecca
- Died: 683 Tehouda (near the oasis of Sidi Okba in present-day Algeria)
- Resting place: Sidi Okba Mosque, Algeria
- Relations: Banu al-Harith ibn Fihr (clan); Habib ibn Abi Ubaida al-Fihri (grandson); Abd al-Rahman ibn Habib al-Fihri (great-grandson)
- Children: Abu Ubayda ibn Uqba
- Parent(s): Nafi ibn Abd al-Qays; Salma bint Harmalah

Military service
- Allegiance: Rashidun Caliphate; Umayyad Caliphate
- Branch/service: Rashidun army
- Years of service: 635–683
- Rank: General
- Battles/wars: Muslim conquest of Egypt; First battle of Dongola; Muslim conquest of the Maghreb; Expedition to the Fezzan; Battle of Sufetula (647); Battle of Vescera †

ʿUqba ibn Nāfiʿ ibn ʿAbd al-Qays al-Fihrī al-Qurashī (Arabic: عقبة بن نافع بن عبد القيس الفهري القرشي), also simply known as Uqba ibn Nafi (622–683), was an Arab general serving the Rashidun Caliphate since the reign of Umar and later the Umayyad Caliphate during the reigns of Mu'awiya I and Yazid I, leading the Muslim conquest of the Maghreb, including present-day Libya, Tunisia, Algeria and Morocco and a failed attempt in Nubia. He is credited with establishing Umayyad rule in North Africa. Uqba was the nephew of Amr ibn al-As. He is often surnamed al-Fihri in reference to the Banu Fihr, a clan connected to the Quraysh. His descendants would be known as the ʿUqbids or Fihrids. Uqba was defeated and killed at the Battle of Vescera in 683.

== Early life ==
Uqba was born in 622. Uqba, as a general of the Rashidun Caliphate, was raised in a thoroughly Islamic environment with a strong military character, and actively participated in the golden age of the Muslim Expansions. He entered the Maghreb alongside his uncle Amr ibn al-As while still in the early years of youth, around the age of fourteen. It is likely that he was accompanied by his father, Nāfiʿ ibn ʿAbd al-Qays, who had taken part in the war against Nubia alongside Abd Allah ibn Sa'd. It is also possible that he entered Barqa via al-Ṣaʿīd or Faiyum. His father Nāfiʿ was one of the first Muslims to settle in Egypt.

== Military and Political career ==
=== Military Role and Expeditions ===
==== Conquest of Sudan ====
During the Muslim conquest of the Maghreb, the Sudanese element entered into the service of the Islamic state. ʿUqba ibn Nāfiʿ led an expedition into the southern desert, reaching Fezzan, and from there to Waddan, Germa, and Kawar, near Kanem in Bilād al-Sūdān. These regions had broken their pact with the Arab conquerors and fought against them, so he imposed on each of them a tribute of three hundred and sixty slaves.

==== Role in the Conquests of the Cyrenaican deserts and Fezzan ====
After Amr ibn al-As had taken control of Barqa, he began preparing to invade the surrounding regions of the Maghreb. He organized two armies: one advanced along the coast to seize Tripolitania and nearby coastal cities such as Sirte and Sabratha, while the other moved inland to capture many of the key settlements in the interior desert—centers of resistance in the heart of the land—to prevent their inhabitants from attacking the Muslims from behind and cutting off their retreat. The most important of these oases was the Fezzan oasis. Amr dispatched his commander ʿUqba ibn Nāfiʿ to Fezzan, which he conquered, and he then continued his advance until reaching Zawila, which he secured through a peace agreement. ʿUqba succeeded in his mission. According to Ibn Abd al-Hakam, "The land between Barqa and Zawila came under Muslim control."

Amr ibn al-As wrote to the Caliph ʿUmar ibn al-Khattab reporting the success of ʿUqba ibn Nāfiʿ. According to al-Baladhuri:

“He appointed ʿUqba ibn Nāfiʿ al-Fihri over the Maghreb, and he reached Zawila. The people of Barqa all submitted willingly—their obedience was commendable. The Muslims among them paid the alms (ṣadaqa), and the non-Muslim subjects acknowledged the poll tax (jizya). ʿUqba arrived in Zawila and in all the areas between it and Barqa that he deemed manageable. He ordered all his governors to collect the alms from the wealthy and redistribute it to the poor, to collect the poll tax from the dhimmīs and send it to him in Egypt, and to take one-tenth and half of one-tenth (ʿushr and niṣf al-ʿushr) from the lands of the Muslims.”

After capturing Barqa, then proceeding to Tripolitania in 644. Upon conquering Cyrenaica in 642 or 643, Amr ibn al-As fixed the jizyah to be paid by its Berber tribes at 13,000 dinars. After a short while, Amr ibn al-As returned back to Egypt for multiple reasons and one of them was at the request of ʿUmar ibn al-Khattab, after leaving ʿUqba ibn Nāfiʿ in charge of Barqa and the surrounding desert regions to call their inhabitants to Islam. Barqa then became the base of the Islamic army in western Egypt.

==== Military Campaigns during the Ummayad Era ====
After the First Fitna and establishment of the Umayyad Caliphate in 661 by Mu'awiya I, a second invasion of the Maghreb began. An army of 10,000 Muslims and thousands of others led by Uqba departed from Damascus and marched into the Exarchate of Africa, beginning another long series of Umayyad attempts to conquer all of Roman Africa. Later, Caliph Muʿāwiya ibn Abī Sufyān appointed Mu'awiya ibn Hudayj as governor of Ifriqiya in the year 45 AH / 665 CE. His appointment was primarily due to his capability as a military commander, the large number of his tribesmen in Egypt, and his support for Caliph Uthman ibn Affan during the struggle for the caliphate, in addition to his knowledge of military affairs. He was accompanied by Abd al-Malik ibn Marwan, Yahya ibn al-Hakam, Khalid ibn Thabit al-Fahmi, Abd Allah ibn al-Zubayr, and Abd Allah ibn Umar, along with detachments from the armies of Levant (al-Sham) and Egypt, numbering ten thousand soldiers. Ibn Hudayj marched with his forces through Barqa and Tripolitania. ʿUqba ibn Nāfiʿ, who was in command of the garrison in Barca, joined the campaign. Ibn Hudayj benefited from his experience with the nature of warfare in those regions.

Muʿāwiya ibn Ḥudayj was unable to complete the conquest of Ifriqiya, as Caliph Muʿāwiya ibn Abī Sufyān dismissed him in 50 AH / 670 CE and established him as governor of Egypt. He appointed ʿUqba ibn Nāfiʿ al-Fihri as governor of Ifriqiya.

=== Governorship of Ifriqya ===
Uqba was appointed as the governor of Ifriqiya after the dismissing of ibn Ḥudayj. It is known that ʿUqba was among the first Muslim soldiers to participate in Amr ibn al-As’s campaign against Barqa in 23 AH / 643–644 CE, and he remained there for a quarter of a century, during which he distinguished himself and led some conquests. ʿUqba had been residing in Barqa and Zawila since the time of Amr ibn al-As’s governorship. Arab historians described ʿUqba ibn Nāfiʿ as a devout and pious man, calling him “ʿUqba the one whose prayers were answered” (ʿUqba al-mustajāb).

==== Uqba’s Campaigns in the Desert Hinterland of Tripolitania and Ifriqiya ====
ʿUqba ibn Nāfiʿ launched a campaign in the desert regions of Tripolitania and Ifriqiya, simultaneously with the coastal campaign of Muʿāwiya ibn Ḥudayj, and under his authority. This followed the general strategy of Arab commanders to secure both desert and coastal zones against any threats that might endanger the main forces from those directions.

- Waddan: In 46 AH / 666 CE, ʿUqba set out after Muʿāwiya ibn Ḥudayj, accompanied by two Muslim commanders experienced in desert warfare: Busr ibn Abi Artat and Sharik ibn Sumayya al-Muradi. He reached Ghadames from Sirte, leaving his army there under the command of Umar ibn Ali al-Qurashi and Zuhayr ibn Qays al-Balawi. He then advanced with a force of 400 cavalry, 100 camels, and 800 water-skins until he arrived at Waddan, which he conquered. He imposed a fine on its king of 360 slaves for violating a prior treaty made with Busr during Amr ibn al-As’s siege of Tripoli.
- Germa: From Waddan, ʿUqba advanced to Germa, the principal city of the Fezzan region. As he approached, he sent a message inviting them to embrace Islam. They accepted, and he encamped six miles outside the city. Their king came to meet ʿUqba and agreed to pay a tribute of approximately 360 slaves. ʿUqba immediately sent this tribute eastward.
- Kawar: ʿUqba continued his advance southward, conquering the forts of Fezzan until he reached Kawar. According to al-Bakri, he arrived at Jawān, a major fortress located on rugged terrain atop a mountain—it was the capital of Kawar. He reached an agreement with its king to pay a tribute of 360 slaves. When ʿUqba asked a guide about lands further south of Kawar, they replied that they knew of none. So he turned back and encamped at a place called Mā' al-Faras (Water of the Horse). The Muslims suffered severe thirst there, nearly dying. ʿUqba prayed two units of prayer and supplicated to God. His horse began pawing at the ground until it uncovered solid rock, from which water burst forth. ʿUqba called on the people to dig, and the spot was named Māʾ al-Faras. Then Uqba returned unexpectedly via a different route from the one he had previously taken to Kawar, until they became reassured and opened the city gates. Then Uqba surprised them and attacked them at night, finding them in a state of security. Uqba engaged them in battle and seized what was in the city. Uqba's sudden return with his army to the lands of Kawar was a very skillful maneuver, through which he applied the principle of surprise timing, descending upon Kawar at a time when its people did not expect it. After that, Uqba returned and camped at the location of Zawila, then departed to his soldiers after five months. Uqba penetrated the desert with few, light forces because movement in the desert is very difficult with large forces due to the scarcity of water. This was also because he estimated that he would not encounter large forces during his penetration, as the regular Roman forces would not be able to fight in such terrain—their domain being the coastal areas where water is available. Thus, Uqba faced only the forces of the original desert inhabitants. He marched with his army heading toward the Maghreb and avoided traveling on the coastal road that connects Sirte with Gabès, either due to the abundance of fortresses and garrisons in this coastal region, or because he wanted to surprise the people of Ifriqiya by storming their lands coming from within the desert before they had prepared to repel and resist him. Uqba sent a detachment from his army to Ghadames and conquered it. Then he marched to conquer Gafsa and Kasserine (Qastiliya), then Uqba returned to Kairouan. Caliph Muawiya ibn Abi Sufyan was fully aware of what was happening on the soil of the Maghreb and was also knowledgeable about Uqba ibn Nafi's military efforts.Therefore, he appointed Uqba ibn Nafi as governor of Ifriqiya in the year 50 AH / 670 CE and sent him ten thousand horsemen, to whom Uqba added those Berbers who had converted to Islam, the army stationed in the city of Sirte in Cyrenaica, in addition to the detachment with which he had raided Fezzan and Kawar.

Uqba realized that the Islamic conquest would not be stabilized except by establishing a city on the Maghrebi soil to serve as a headquarters for Muslims and a launching point for continuing the Islamic conquests. Therefore, he began building the city of Kairouan. In other words, the founding of Kairouan was a true expression of the stability of the Islamic entity in the Maghreb, and with Uqba's governorship began the province of Ifriqiya, even though it remained subordinate for some time to the government of Fustat.Undoubtedly, the establishment of Kairouan demonstrates sound political thinking, as this would help transform the Maghreb into part of the Caliphate, thereby achieving the supreme goal of the Islamic conquest movement. Without this, it would remain merely a frontier region of raids and expeditions.

The building of Kairouan demonstrates Uqba ibn Nafi's deep understanding of the psychology of the people of the land where he had stayed for nearly a quarter of a century. He said:

The people of Ifriqiya, when a leader enters among them, respond to Islam, but when he leaves, those who had responded to God's religion return to disbelief. Therefore, I believe, O community of Muslims, that you should establish a city there that will be a source of strength for Islam until the end of time.

The Berbers were influenced by what they witnessed of Uqba's conduct, and many of them embraced Islam. Then Uqba began building Kairouan in the year 50 AH / 670 CE to be the first base for Muslims in Ifriqiya, as he had learned of the inhabitants' intentions through his residence among them. The story of building Kairouan began when Uqba led an Arab army to North Africa, crossing the Egyptian deserts, and setting up military posts at regular intervals along his route. In a region of what is now Tunisia, he established the town now called Kairouan (meaning "camp" or "caravanserai" in Persian) about 99 miles south of present-day Tunis, which he used as a base for further operations. This became a place of religious pilgrimage and the most important city in North Africa. Kairouan was chosen as the capital of the new Umayyad province of Ifriqiya. Uqba chose the site for its first mosque, and the Great Mosque of Kairouan was constructed on the same year. This mosque has served as a model of all later mosques in the Maghreb, and is considered one of the masterpieces of Islamic architecture. Arab historians differed regarding the area of Kairouan. Both Ibn Idhari and Al-Nuwayri estimated it at approximately 13,600 cubits, while Ibn al-Athir and Al-Salawi estimated it at 3,600 cubits. Another Arabic historian points out that the first area mentioned by Ibn Idhari and Al-Nuwayri—7,000 meters—is reasonable in relation to the housing for the military, tribes, and those who joined them from the local population. As for the second area, estimated at approximately 5,800 meters, it is reasonable in relation to the original city plan, the construction of walls, and defensive measures. The role of Kairouan was clear and evident in spreading Islam and Arabization among the Berber tribes, as its scholars from among the sons of the Companions and the Followers were the best preachers and the best supporters. The building of Kairouan resulted in many Berbers embracing Islam. Ibn al-Athir says: "Many of the Berbers entered Islam, and the Muslims' plan was strengthened, and the courage of the soldiers there in the city of Kairouan was reinforced, and they felt secure and at peace in their residence, so Islam became firmly established there." Kairouan would become a center of religious influence for teaching the inhabitants of the land the laws of the true Islamic religion.When the construction of Kairouan was completed, it was inhabited by a group of Berbers who had entered Islam and began to speak Arabic and become Arabized. The years of Uqba's first governorship from 50–56 AH represent the first step in establishing the Islamic Arab Maghreb. Uqba, during his construction of Kairouan, continued to send military expeditions to establish Arab authority in the region and secure resources and provisions. After Uqba remained in his governorship for five years, spending most of them establishing Kairouan and spreading Islam in the nearby regions, he was dismissed by Maslama ibn Mukhallad al-Ansari, the governor of Egypt, who appointed Abu al-Muhajir Dinar in his place. Some researchers have interpreted the reasons for Uqba's removal from the governorship of Ifriqiya as being due to his preoccupation with building Kairouan rather than conducting raids, which reduced the spoils he sent to the governors of the Mashriq, and the abundance of these spoils was the measure by which a commander's diligence in leadership was assessed. However, the authors do not agree with this opinion, arguing that Caliph Mu'awiya wanted to reward Maslama ibn Mukhallad, who was one of his most prominent supporters.

==== Dismissal and Imprisonment of Uqba ====
When Abu al-Muhajir arrived in the Maghreb, he treated Uqba ibn Nafi harshly upon dismissing him, reportedly placing him in iron chains. One researcher explains Abu al-Muhajir Dinar's behavior as stemming from Uqba's popularity in Ifriqiya among both Arabs and Berbers, reasoning that Abu al-Muhajir believed he could not easily control his governorship unless he restricted Uqba's freedom, at least temporarily. This interpretation appears largely reasonable. When Caliph Mu'awiya learned of what had befallen Uqba, he wrote to Abu al-Muhajir ordering Uqba's release and sent messengers to escort him out of Gabès. Sources indicate that upon his release, Uqba went to Qasr al-Ma, one of the areas near Kairouan, prayed two prostrations, then supplicated, saying: "O God, do not let me die until I gain power over Abu al-Muhajir Dinar." Abu al-Muhajir reportedly remained fearful after learning of this supplication, saying: "He is a devout servant whose prayers are not rejected." Another Arab historian argues that Maslama ibn Mukhallad was responsible for the mistreatment Uqba ibn Nafi suffered at Abu al-Muhajir Dinar's hands, basing his opinion on the rivalry between Maslama and Uqba over governorship, honor, and favor with Caliph Mu'awiya. Despite Maslama's attempts to appease Uqba and apologize while denying responsibility, this only suggests that Maslama feared Mu'awiya's anger when Uqba would report the mistreatment he had suffered. Consequently, he quickly blamed Abu al-Muhajir Dinar. According to Ibn Sa'd's account of Caliph Mu'awiya ibn Abi Sufyan's words, responsibility for Uqba's dismissal lay with Maslama ibn Mukhallad. When Uqba presented his complaint to Caliph Mu'awiya, the caliph apologized, acknowledging Maslama's service and loyalty before reinstating Uqba to his position. In reality, historical sources conflicted on this issue, leading one modern researcher to frankly admit his confusion, asking: "Who is responsible? Should blame fall on Maslama ibn Mukhallad as the commander, or on Abu al-Muhajir as the executor?" He concluded that blaming the latter was closer to reality, reasoning that "the witness may see what the absent cannot see."

=== The Second Governorship of Uqba ibn Nafi (62-64 AH / 681-683 CE) ===
==== Gentle Reproach between Uqba and Mu'awiya ibn Abi Sufyan ====
When Uqba ibn Nafi was dismissed from Ifriqiya in 55 AH / 674 CE, he traveled to Damascus and met with Caliph Mu'awiya ibn Abi Sufyan, saying to him:

I conquered the lands, they submitted to me, I built mosques, established residences, and settled people, then you sent this Ansari servant who mistreated me upon dismissal.

Mu'awiya apologized to him, saying: "I have restored you to your position as governor..." Despite Mu'awiya's promise to Uqba to restore him to the governorship of Ifriqiya, the situation remained unchanged until Yazid I assumed the caliphate and learned of Uqba's complaint, whereupon he reinstated him as governor in the year 62 AH / 681 CE. This was his second governorship over Ifriqiya and the entire Maghreb. Caliph Yazid said: "Reach it before it perishes and is lost!"

==== Uqba Returns to Ifriqiya ====
Uqba returned to the governorship of Ifriqiya and seized it from Maslama ibn Mukhallad, the governor of Egypt. Uqba marched to Kairouan with ten thousand horsemen. He dismissed Abu al-Muhajir Dinar and bound him with iron chains. He even took him on raids to Sous while he was in chains. Uqba ordered the people to return to Kairouan and began developing it, relocating people there. The city flourished and its importance grew. Uqba rode with the military commanders, some Companions, and Followers, circling around Kairouan while supplicating for it, saying:

O Lord, fill it with knowledge and jurisprudence, fill it with those obedient to You, and make it a source of strength for Your religion and humiliation for those who disbelieve in You.

What draws attention in Uqba's policy during his second governorship is that he did not adhere to Abu al-Muhajir Dinar's policy, which had proven greatly successful and resulted in many Berbers of Aures entering Islam.

==== Uqba Goes Out for Jihad ====
Uqba's goal was to complete the conquest of the Maghreb, so he left Zuhayr ibn Qays al-Balawi in charge of Kairouan. He left with him the families and wealth, then gathered his sons and said to them:

I have sold myself to God the Almighty, so I will continue to fight those who disbelieve in God...

Uqba advanced to Baghai, located near the Aures Mountains, and managed to defeat the Berbers and Romans before seizing their wealth. Then he proceeded to the city of Monastir, which was one of the greatest Byzantine cities. Uqba continued to Lambaesis, the strongest of the Byzantine fortresses, and engaged them in fierce combat. People thought it would be their destruction, but he defeated them and pursued them to the gate of their fortress, capturing abundant spoils.

==== Conquest of the Zab Region ====
Uqba continued his advance to the Zab region, which was a vast territory containing several cities and many villages. He targeted its greatest city, Arba, and the Muslims fought its inhabitants at Wadi al-Msila. When the Byzantines learned of Uqba's arrival, they took refuge in their fortress and most of them fled to the mountains. He then met the Romans at the valley in the evening but disliked fighting them at night, so the forces remained awake throughout the night, which is why people call it "Wadi Sahr" (Valley of Vigilance) to this day. He prepared for battle in the morning. The fighting intensified and the tide of battle turned in favor of the Muslims. Al-Raqiq describes the scene of their victory, saying:

The people were routed, and the greatest of the Berber knights were killed, so their glory departed from the Zab and they were humiliated for the rest of time.

Uqba captured abundant spoils from them, and the Byzantines lost their control over the Zab. The Muslims' seizure of the Zab region and their control over Wadi al-Msila marked a decisive turning point in the course of the conquests in Ifriqiya. Until now, the war had been between the Byzantines and Arabs while the Berbers remained neutral. When the Arabs entered this region, they entered a Berber territory of the interior and seized the settlements of Berber tribes, making these tribes realize that they too were targets of this conquest. The relationship between the Byzantines and Berbers had been negative, as the Byzantines confined themselves to the coasts and interior fortresses, supported only by a small number of locals who had been influenced by Byzantine culture and adopted Christianity. When the Byzantines witnessed Uqba's successive victories in the Zab, they believed it was futile to confront the Arabs alone, so they sought Berber assistance, which the Berbers agreed to provide. We have no details about the nature of the agreement between the Byzantines and Berbers, but undoubtedly the Islamic threat surrounding their lands made them cooperate in resisting the Muslims.Uqba moved from the Zab to the city of Tiaret, where he found the Byzantines and Berbers standing as one front to resist him. Fierce fighting broke out between the Muslims on one side and the Berbers and Byzantines on the other, with their numbers exceeding the Islamic force. Ibn al-Athir says: "The situation became difficult for the Muslims due to the enemy's large numbers, but then Allah granted them victory, and the Byzantines and Berbers were routed." Despite being outnumbered compared to the Byzantines and Berbers, the Muslims' opponents did not hold firm long on the battlefield, and their affair ended with them either killed or fled.

==== Conquest of the Maghreb Al-Aqsa ====
When Uqba intended to enter the Maghreb al-Aqsa (Far Maghreb), Abu al-Muhajir advised him to withdraw from Tangier because the Berber tribe of Aurès had converted to Islam with Kusaila's conversion, and there was no reason to raid them. He advised him to send a governor with Kusaila, but Uqba refused. He became the first Arab Muslim commander to enter the Far Maghreb, conquering the cities of Ceuta and Tangier. Tangier was ruled by a man called Julian, who controlled the coast of the strait at Ceuta. He was among the noble Byzantine kings. He treated Uqba kindly, presented him with fine gifts, and submitted to his rule. When Uqba asked him about the sea of Al-Andalus, he said:

"It is well-guarded and cannot be approached." Uqba said: "Show me where the Berbers and Byzantines are." He replied: "You have left the Byzantines behind you, and ahead of you are only Berbers and their horsemen." He asked: "Where are they located?" He said: "In Sous al-Adna (Nearer Sous). They are a people without religion who have not entered Christianity. They eat carrion and drink the blood of their livestock. They are like beasts, deny Allah the Almighty, and do not know Him."

The egyptian historian Husayn Mones notes that Julian was neither Byzantine nor Berber, as he told Uqba that the Byzantines were behind him and the Berbers ahead. His warning to Uqba against crossing to Al-Andalus indicates he was eager to spare Al-Andalus from the Muslims, which only makes sense if Julian was from Al-Andalus and concerned about its affairs. This supports the view that he was a Visigoth appointed by the Goths in Spain to guard the land from any aggressor. It is established that Uqba was convinced by Julian's opinion and drew up his military plan accordingly. Uqba launched his attack on Sous al-Adna, encountering Berbers in heavy numbers. They were routed, and he killed them extensively. Muslim cavalry spread throughout the lands and coasts, capturing women and seizing wealth, so that a Byzantine slave girl from them was worth a thousand dinars in the Mashriq. The Berbers fled before him to Sous al-Aqsa (Farthest Sous), where they assembled a large force, but Uqba managed to defeat them. He marched until he reached the Atlantic Ocean, Uqba proceeded to a place known as Ma'a Fars (Horse's Water), then took the route back to Ifriqiya via Ighiran, then to Tazna, then to the place of Shakir and the lands of Doukkala, calling them to Islam, but they refused. Uqba fought them, then returned to the lands of Doukkala and to Haskura.

Despite Uqba's focus on conquest, he did not forget during that campaign to invite the inhabitants of those lands to Islam, which was the primary objective of these conquests. He also established mosques in Igli in Sous, in Draa, in Sous al-Aqsa, and in Wadi Nfis.

== Death ==
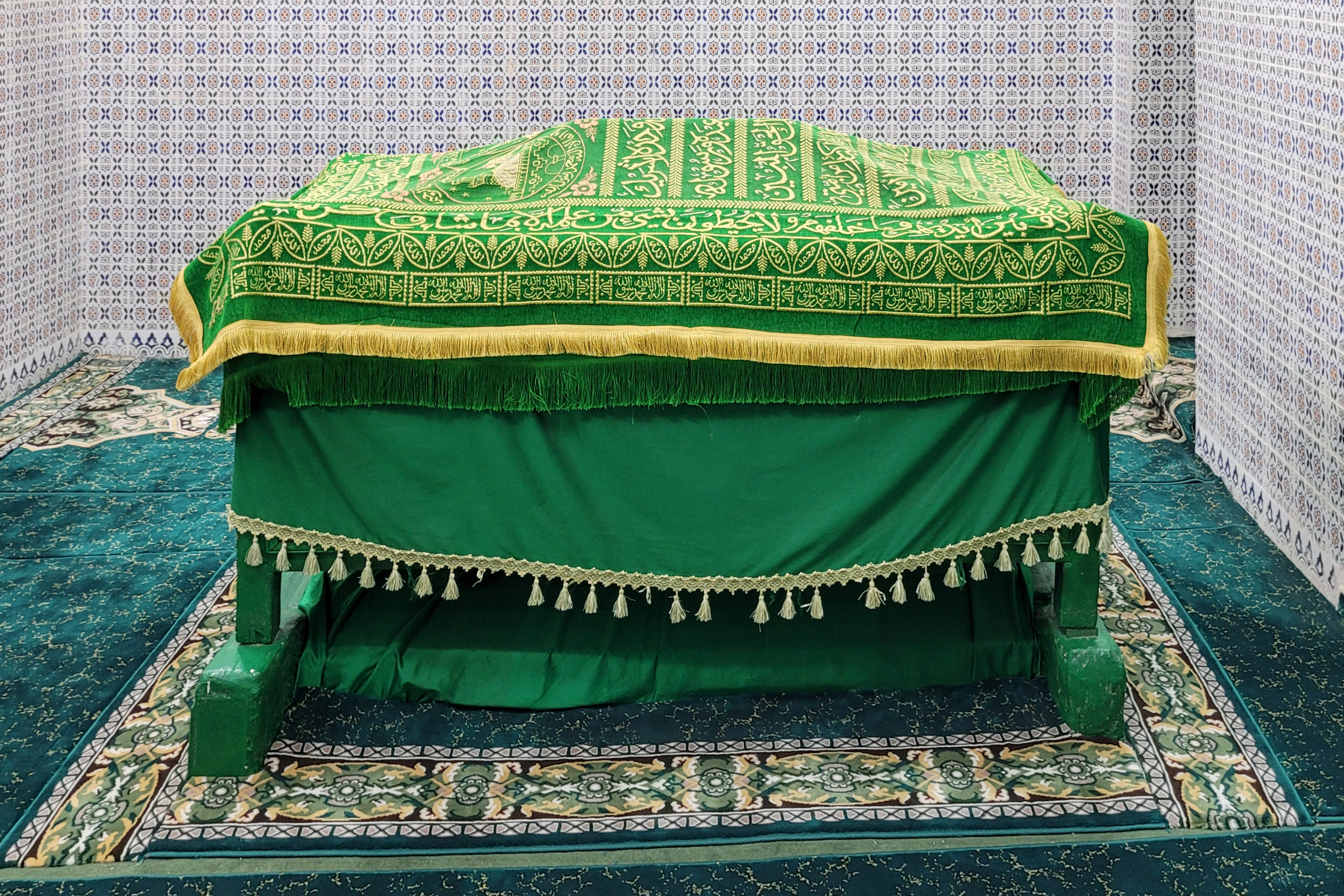
The grave of Uqba in Sidi Okba, Algeria

In 683 Uqba was ambushed by the Berber Christian king Kusaila and his Byzantine allies in the Battle of Vescera. Uqba was killed beside his hated rival, Abu al-Muhajir Dinar. His armies evacuated Kairouan and withdrew to Barca, though it was recaptured in 688.

== Legacy ==
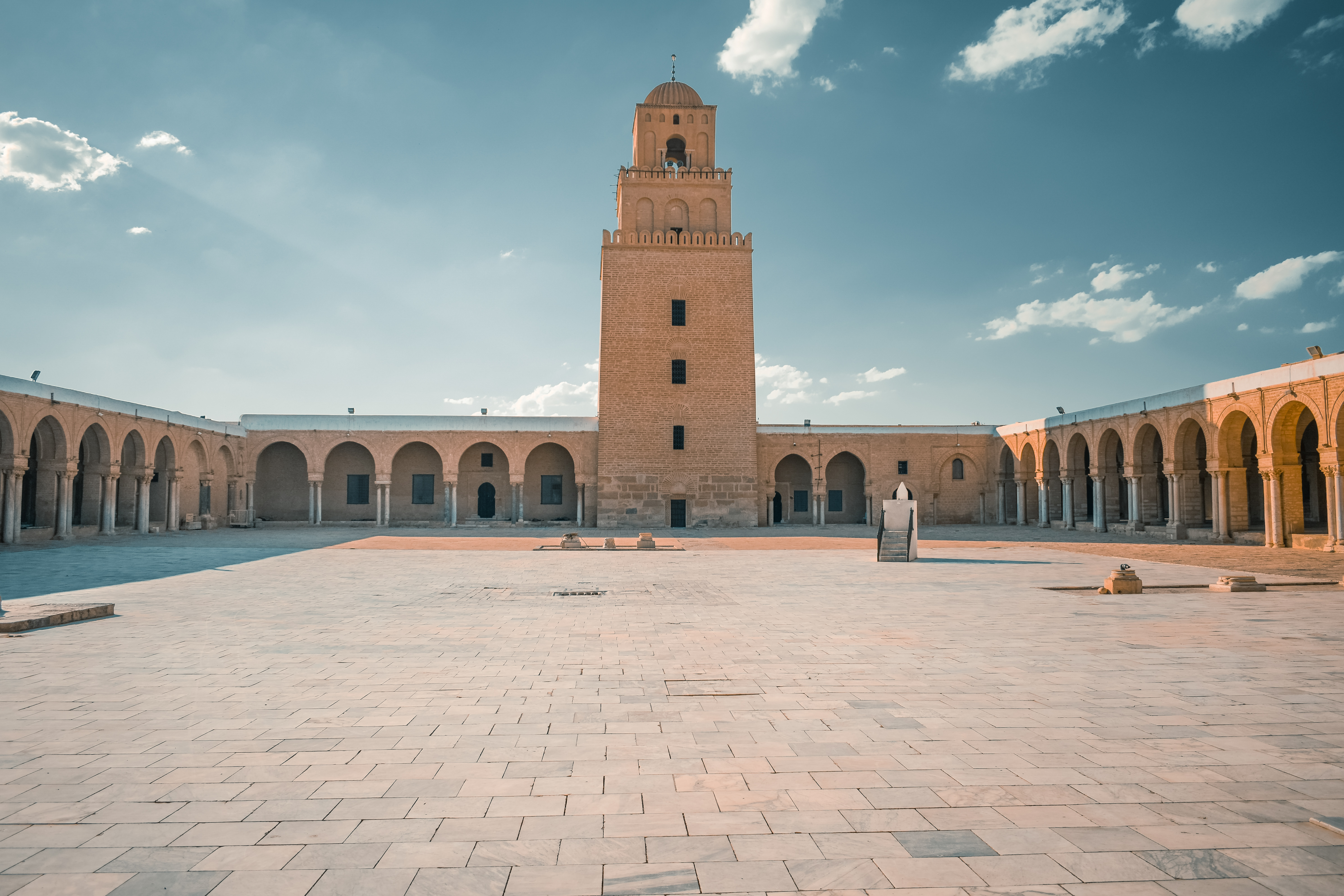
Great Mosque of Kairouan or Mosque of Uqba ibn Nafi in Tunisia, with its minaret being one of the oldest standing minarets in the world

Uqba's death granted him the legacy of a martyr in North Africa and the first major Muslim figure to be martyred in North Africa. Various traditions support Uqba wanting to die as a martyr. For example, one tradition holds that a Muslim leader warned Uqba of his martyrdom saying "O Uqba, maybe you will be one of the army that enters paradise on their mounts." Various groups in North and West Africa claim descent from Uqba like the Fulani, the Kunta and the Iwellemmedan.

In 686, Sidi Uqba Mosque was built as a mausoleum dedicated to him after his death. The building was at first built in a simple manner, completely made out of limestone mortars, with no precious materials used. This architectural style resembled some of the oldest Islamic architectures and the mosques built Muhammad. The village Sidi Okba grew around this mosque. Al-Watiya Air Base in Libya is also known as "Okba ibn Nafa Air Base" after him.

== Historical accounts ==
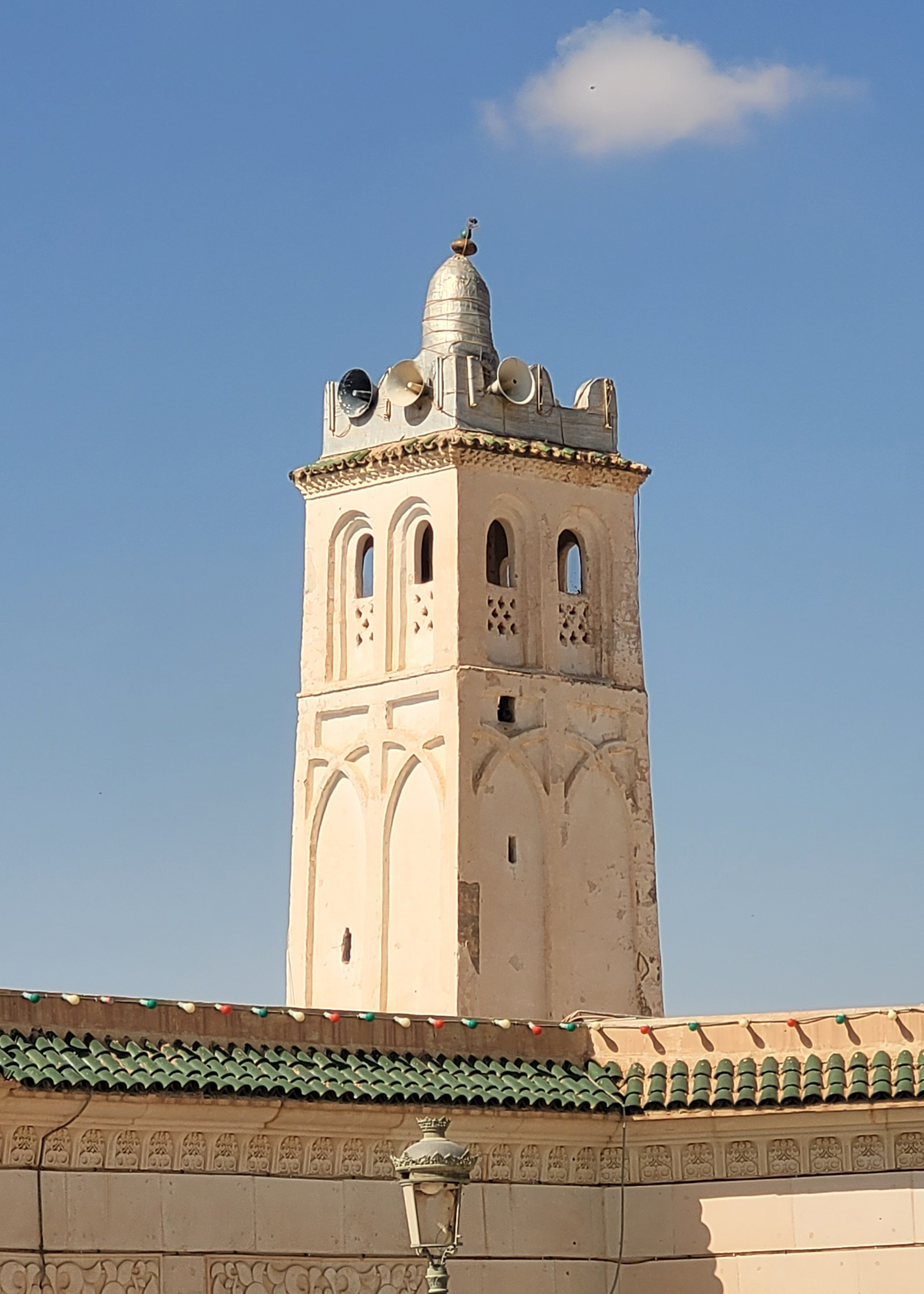
Minaret of the Sidi Okba Mosque in Algeria

Extant records of most of the accounts describing Arab conquests of North Africa in general and Uqba's conquests in particular date back to at least two centuries after the conquests took place.

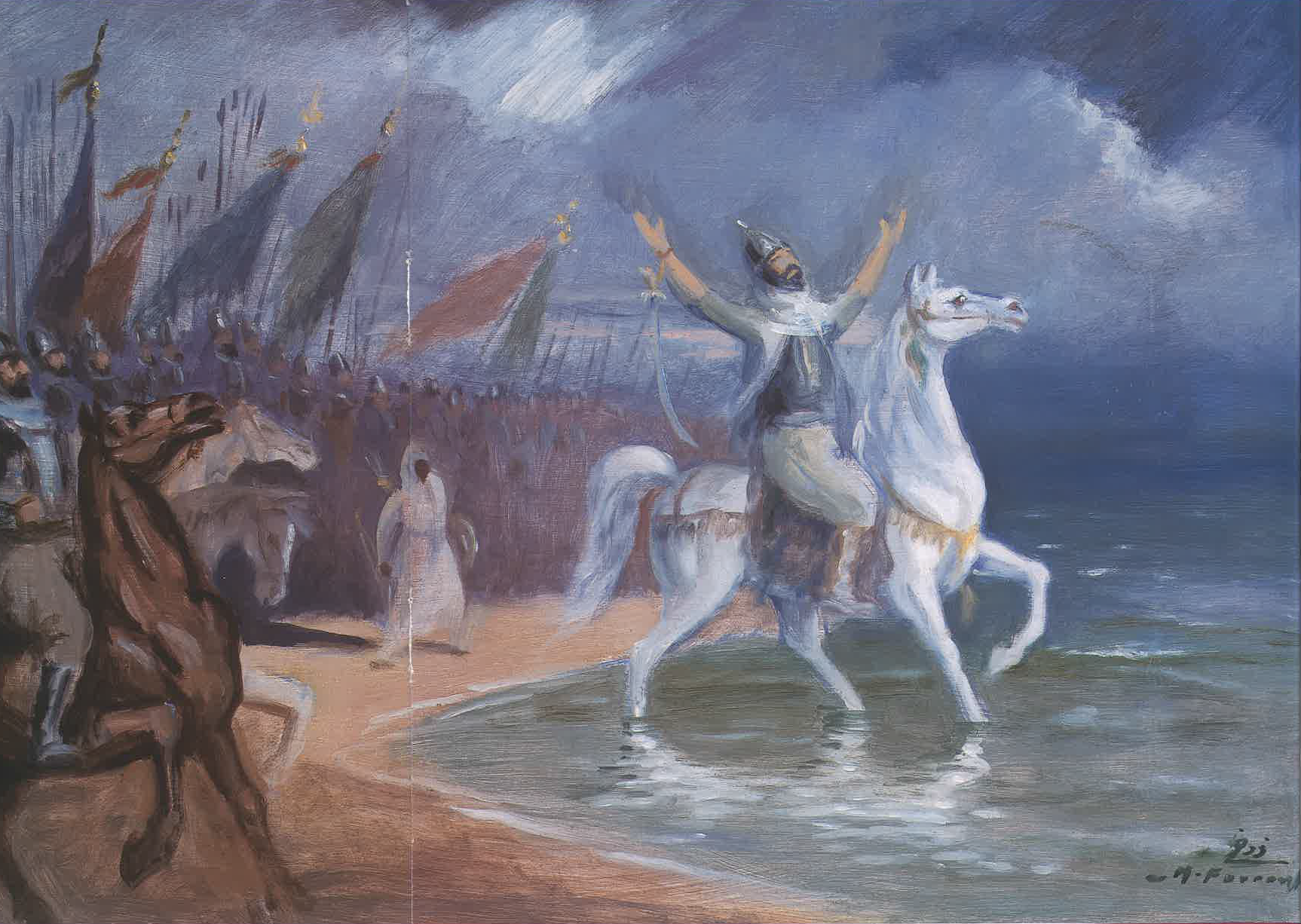
Moustafa Farroukh's 1954 painting of Uqba reaching the Atlantic

One of the earliest reports comes from the Arab chronicler Ibn Idhari in his Al-Bayan al-Mughrib. In it, Ibn Idhari describes the moment when Uqba reached the Atlantic Ocean, where he allegedly said: |

"O God, if the sea had not prevented me, I would have galloped on for ever like Alexander the Great, upholding your faith and fighting the unbelievers!"

Edward Gibbon, referring to Uqba ibn Nafi as Akbah, gives him the title "Conqueror of Africa," beginning his story when he "marched from Damascus at the head of ten thousand of the bravest Arabs; and the genuine force of the Moslems was enlarged by the doubtful aid and conversion of many thousand Barbarians." He then marched into North Africa. Gibbon continues: "It would be difficult, nor is it necessary, to trace the accurate line of the progress of Akbah." On the North African coast, "the well-known titles of Bugia, and Tangier define the more certain limits of the Saracen victories." Gibbon then tells the story of Akbah's conquest of the Roman province of Mauretania Tingitana:

The fearless Akbah plunged into the heart of the country, traversed the wilderness in which his successors erected the splendid capitals of Fez and Morocco, and at length penetrated to the verge of the Atlantic and the great desert.... The career, though not the zeal, of Akbah was checked by the prospect of a boundless ocean. He spurred his horse into the waves, and raising his eyes to heaven, exclaimed: 'Great God! if my course were not stopped by this sea, I would still go on, to the unknown kingdoms of the West, preaching the unity of the holy name, and putting to the sword the rebellious nations who worship another gods than Allah.'

Scholarship on the life and conquests of ibn Nafi are available, but most have not been translated from their original Arabic.

== See also ==
- Wheelus Air Base
- Medieval Muslim Algeria
- Berbers and Islam
- Early Muslim conquests
- Asid bin Kurz al-Bajali

== References and notes ==
=== Sources ===
- Hamouda, Abdul Hamid Hussein (2007). تاريخ المغرب في العصر الإسلامي منذ الفتح الإسلامي وحتى قيام الدولة الفاطمية (History of the Maghreb in the Islamic Era: From the Islamic Conquest to the Rise of the Fatimid State) (in Arabic). Cairo: Cultural House for Publishing (الدار الثقافية للنشر).
