= Abu al-Muhajir Dinar =

Governor of Ifriqiya under the Umayyad Caliphate (674–681)

Abu al-Muhajir Dinar أبو المهاجر دينار

Governor of Ifriqiya
- In office 674–681
- Monarchs: Mu'awiya I Yazid I
- Preceded by: Uqba ibn Nafi
- Succeeded by: Uqba ibn Nafi

Personal details
- Died: 683 Tabuda, Algeria
- Religion: Islam

Military service
- Allegiance: Umayyad Caliphate
- Battles/wars: Muslim conquest of the Maghreb; Battle of Vescera †

Abu al-Muhajir Dinar (Arabic: أبو المهاجر دينار) was a governor of Ifriqiya under the Umayyad Caliphate and lead the Muslim conquest of the Maghreb. He died in Tabuda after the Battle of Vescera in 683.

== Biography ==
His biography is complicated by the existence of two versions of the history of the Umayyad conquest of North Africa, those written before the 11th century and those written later.

He may have been of Arab, or Coptic origin. He was originally a follower of Maslama ibn Mukhallad, a member of the Ansar, who gave him his freedom. Maslama, one of Muhammad's companions, was appointed by the first Umayyad caliph Muawiyah I to the position of governor of Egypt and Ifriqiya. The inclusion of Ifriqiya was nominal, as until then the Arabs had made only temporary raids in that direction without attempting permanent control.

In 675, Maslama appointed Abu al-Muhajir to the position of amir or general of the Umayyad forces in Ifriqiya. This position was already occupied by Uqba ibn Nafi, a member of the Banu Quraish. Maslama advised Abu al-Muhajir to relieve Uqba of his position with due deference, but it seems that this did not happen. Uqba was shackled and thrown into prison, from which he was only released when the Caliph requested to see him. As Uqba left Ifriqiya for Damascus, he vowed to treat Abu al-Muhajir as he had been treated.

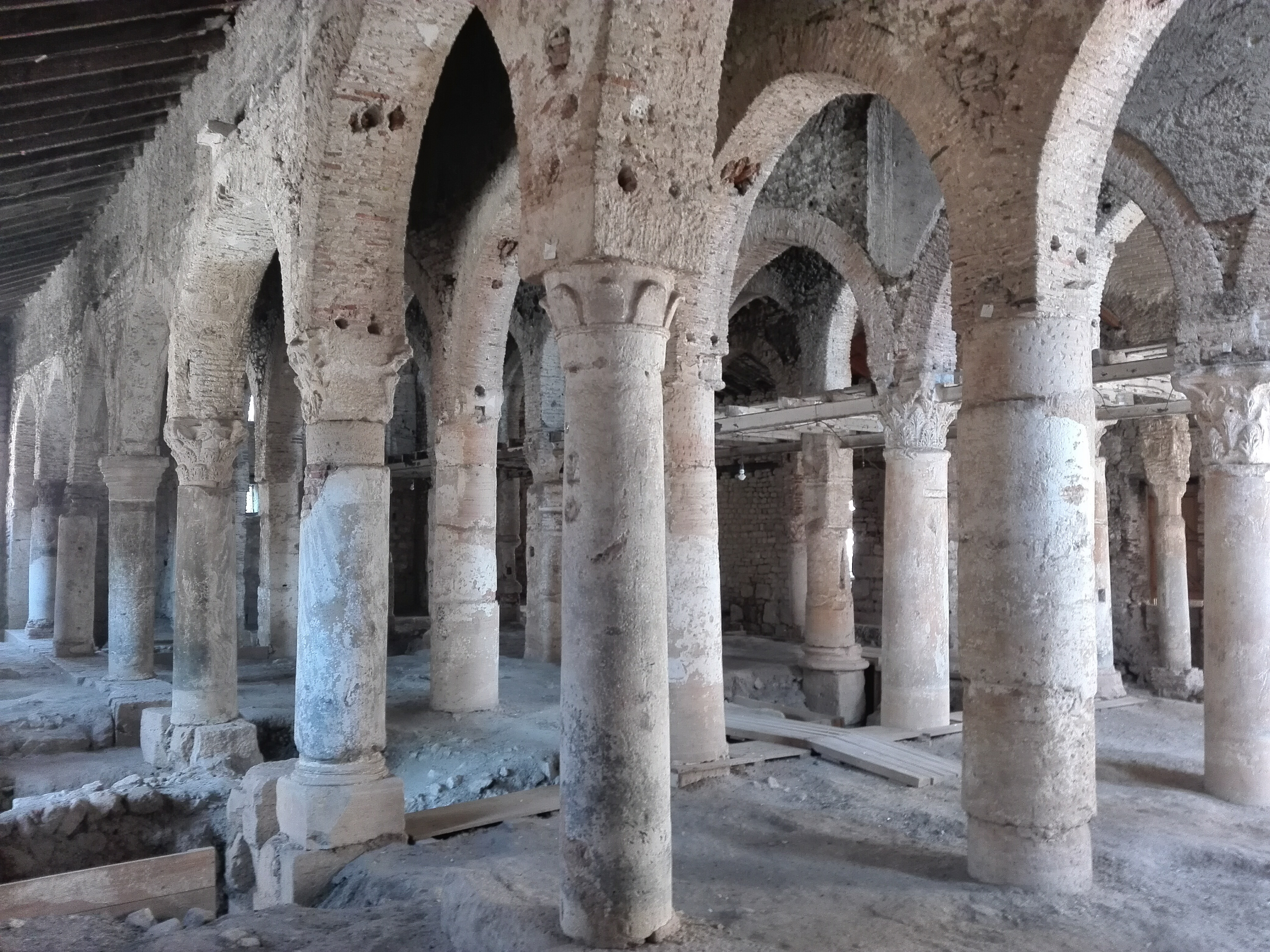
Inside the mosque of Sidi Ghanem (Abu Muhadjir Dinar), Mila, Algeria

Uqba had established a camp at Qayrawan. It is said that Abu al-Muhajir abandoned this (in some accounts, destroyed it) and built another settlement two miles away. According to histories written many centuries later this city was called Tākarwān (Arabic: تاكروان). Until then it had been the custom for the amirs of Ifriqiya to return to Egypt between raids, and Abu al-Muhajir is said to be the first amir to stay in Ifriqiya permanently.

What Abu al-Muhajir accomplished in the nine or so years of his command are not agreed by the two different versions of the histories. Histories written in the 9th century credit him with advancing no further west than Mila, Algeria, while those written from the eleventh century on have him capturing Tlemcen.

Muawiyah's successor as Caliph, Yazid I, was responsible for restoring Uqba to his previous position. Uqba arrived in Ifriqiya in 682, and immediately fulfilled his vow. Abu al-Muhajir was shackled and forced to accompany Uqba whenever he went on expeditions.

In 683, Uqba's forces were ambushed by the Berber chief Kusaila near Tehouda – the ancient Roman fort of Thabudeos – in Algeria. Uqba is said to have offered to unchain Abu al-Muhajir so that he might have a better chance to fight, but Abu al-Muhajir said that he would rather die fighting wearing his chains. Both men were killed in this battle with 300 members of Okba's cavalry.

He is buried in Sidi Okba in Algeria in the al-Shurafa cemetery with 300 dead of the Battle of Vescera in front of the mosque of Sidi Okba or what is the tomb of General Uqba ibn Nafi.

== See also ==
- Umayyad Caliphate
- Issa ibn Abi al-Mouhajir

== Bibliography ==
- Ibn Abd al-Hakam, Kitab Futuh Misr wa'l Maghrib wa'l Andalus. The only substantial English translation of this 9th century work is that of Torrey (who also later edited the critical Arabic edition, Yale University Press, 1932): "The Muhammedan Conquest of Egypt and North Africa in the Years 643-705 A.D., translated from the Original Arabic of Ibn 'Abd-el Hakem'", Biblical and Semitic Studies vol. 1 (1901), 279–330.
- Abu Zaid Abd ur-Rahman bin Muhammad ad-Dabbagh (13th century, updated by Abu al-Fadl Abu al-Qasim ibn Naji in the 15th century), Ma'alim al-Aman fi Ma'arufat Ahl al-Qayrawan. Critical Arabic edition by Ibrahim Shubbuh, Makataba al-Khananaji, Cairo, 1968.
- A. Benabbès: "Les premiers raids arabes en Numidie byzantine: questions toponymiques." In Identités et Cultures dans l'Algérie Antique, University of Rouen, 2005 (ISBN 2-87775-391-3)
- Yves Modéran: "Kusayla, l'Afrique et les Arabes." In Identités et Cultures dans l'Algérie Antique, University of Rouen, 2005 (ISBN 2-87775-391-3).
- Marcel Solignac: Recherches sur les Installations Hydrauliques de Kairouan et des Steppes Tunisiennes du VIIe au XIe Siècle (J.C.), Institut d'Études Orientales de la Faculté des Lettres d'Alger, 1953. (Not just on hydraulics, contains valuable historical research).

| Preceded by Uqba ibn Nafi | Governor of Ifriqiya; 674–681 | Succeeded by Uqba ibn Nafi |
