= Sidi Okba =

Sidi Okba سيدي عقبة
- Commune
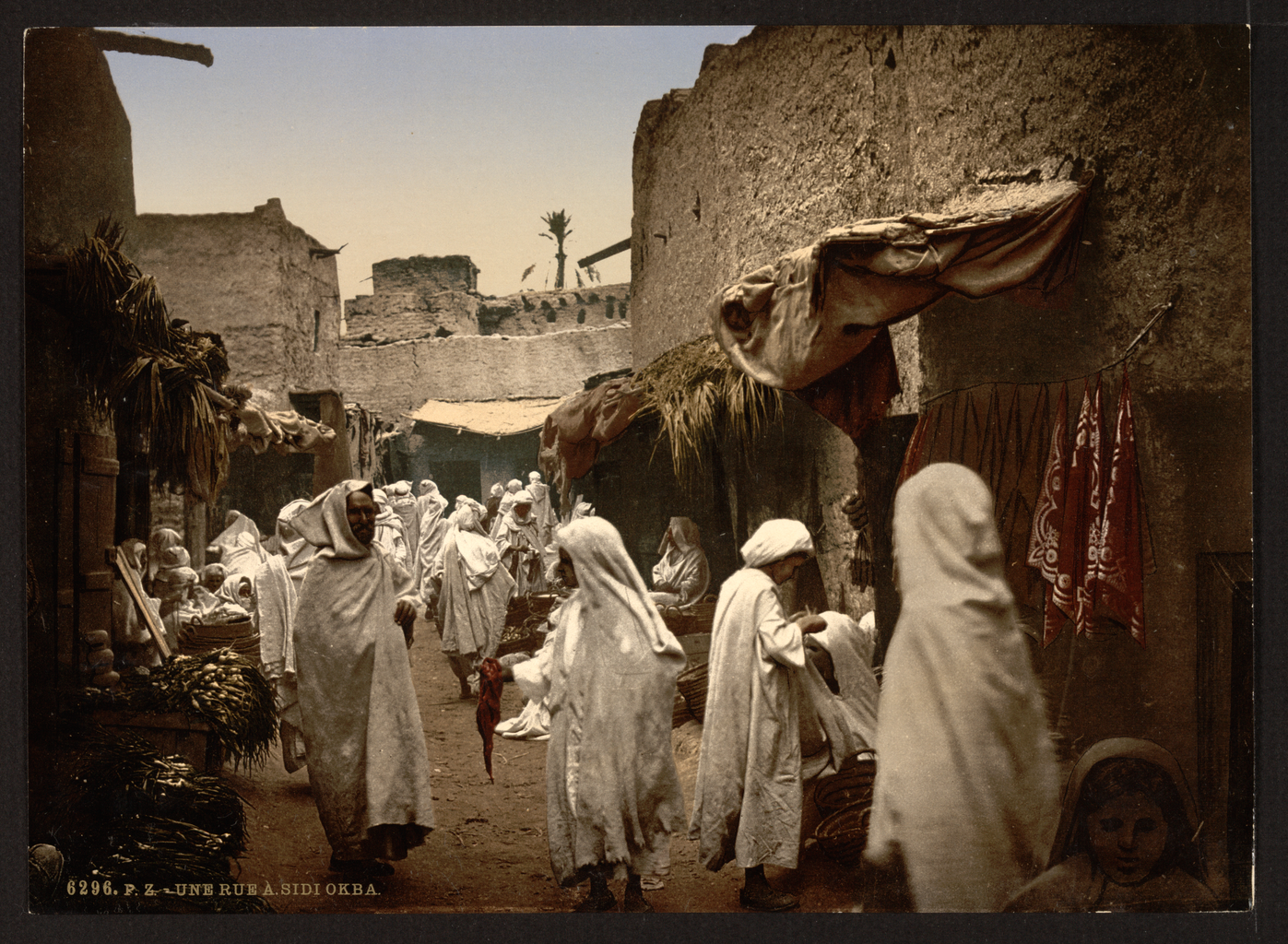
- Sidi Okba street scene

- Location in Algeria
- Coordinates: 34°45′N 05°54′E
- Country: Algeria
- Province: Biskra Province

Area
  - Total: 25,455 km^{2} (9,828 sq mi)

Population (2008)
  - Total: 33,509
  - Density: 132/km^{2} (340/sq mi)
- Time zone: UTC+1 (CET)

Sidi Okba (Arabic: سيدي عقبة) is a commune in the Biskra Province, Algeria. It was named after the Muslim General Uqba ibn Nafi who died there in 683 AD. The nearest big city is Biskra which is located 18 km away.

Sidi Okba sits on an oasis. In 1911 it was described by Baedeker as "the religious center of the Zab". Baedeker stated that the town founded by pilgrims visiting the tomb of Sidi Okba who died in a nearby town called Thouda. The Sidi Okba Mosque, which was built around Okba's tomb, is the oldest Islamic monument in the country.

== See also ==
- Sidi Khaled
