= Abu al-Arab =

Arab Muslim historian, poet and faqih

- أبو العرب
- Born: 9th-century Kairouan, Fatimid Caliphate
- Died: c. 945; Kairouan

Academic work
- Era: Islamic Golden Age, Fatimid era
- Main interests: History, hadith, poetry

Muḥammad ibn Tamīm ibn Tammām al-Tamīmī (Arabic: محمد بن تميم بن تمام التميمي; died 945) more commonly known as Abu al-Arab (أبو العرب; lit. 'Father of the Arabs') was a 10th-century Arab Muslim historian, poet, traditionist and faqih of the Maliki school. His most celebrated work is Tabaqat 'Ulama Ifriqiya (lit. 'Classes of Scholars of Ifriqiya') which include numerous scholars of his time.

== Biography ==
Abu al-Arab's year of birth is unknown, though he most probably was born between 864 and 873 in the city of Kayrawan, the cultural center of Ifriqiya (corresponds to modern-day Tunisia), which at the time was under the control of the Fatimid Caliphate. He belonged to a noble Arab family of governors. His great-grandfather held the governorship of Tunis and he also successfully managed to seize control of Kayrawan in the year 799. Abu al-Arab studied under a number of scholars who themselves learned from the renowned Kayrawani jurist Sahnun (d. 854/55), and he wrote a detailed account of Sahnun's life. Sequentially, Abu al-Arab devoted his time to teaching in Kayrawan, his most notable student was Ibn Abi Zayd al-Kayrawani (d. 996). Abu al-Arab participated in Abu Yazid's revolt against the Fatimids, eventually he was imprisoned. A few years later, he died in 945.

Abu al-Arab relied also on the work of Issa ibn Abi al-Mouhajir for his writings about Ifriqiya.

== Works ==
According to al-Zirkili, Abu al-Arab works consist of 3,000 books which are mostly lost.

- Tabaqat 'Ulama Ifriqiya (طبقات علماء إفريقية; Classes of Scholars of Ifriqiya)
- 'Ibad Ifriqiya (عباد إفريقية; People of Ifriqiya)
- Kitab al-Tarikh (كتاب التاريخ; Book of History) in seventeen volumes.
- Manaqib Bani Tamim (مناقب بني تميم; Merits of Bani Tamim)
- Al-Mihan (المحن; Adversities)
- Fada'il Malik (فضائل مالك; Merits of Malik)
- Manaqib Sahnun (مناقب سحنون; Merits of Sahnun)
- Mawt al-'Ulama (موت العلماء; Death of Scholars) in two volumes.

== See also ==
- List of pre-modern Arab scientists and scholars
