= Issa ibn Abi al-Muhajir =

8th-century Maghrebi author

Issa ibn Muhammed ibn Suleymane ibn Abi al-Muhajir (in Arabic: عيسى بن محمد بن سليمان بن أبي المهاجر), who died toward the end of the 2nd century AH (8th century CE), is believed to be the first Maghrebi (North African) author to write a work about the Islamic conquest of the region.

== Biography ==
Issa ibn Abi al-Muhajir was one of the grandsons of Abu al-Mouhajir Dinar, who played a role in the conquest of Central Maghreb. He is believed to be the first Maghrebi author to have written a work dedicated to this period. This work, titled Maghazi Ifriqiya (in Arabic: مغازي إفريقية, “The Conquests of Ifriqiya”), was written in the second half of the 2nd century AH (8th century CE). Although this work is now lost. It remained accessible, however, until the 4th century AH (10th century CE), when the historian Abu al-Arab al-Tamimi benefited from this work for his own writings.

Issa ibn Abi al-Muhajir died toward the end of the 2nd century AH (8th century CE).

== See also ==
- Muslim conquest of the Maghreb
- Ifriqiya
