= Maslama ibn Mukhallad =

Governor of Egypt and military officer (616/620–682)

Maslama ibn Mukhallad مَسْلَمَةَ بْنِ مَخْلَدٍ

Governor of Egypt
- In office 667–682
- Monarchs: Mu'awiya I Yazid I
- Preceded by: Uqba ibn Amir
- Succeeded by: Sa'id ibn Yazid

Personal details
- Born: 616 or 620 Medina
- Died: 9 April 682 Fustat
- Parent: Mukhallad ibn Samit (father)

Maslama ibn Mukhallad ibn Samit al-Ansari (Arabic: مَسْلَمَةَ بْنِ مَخْلَدٍ بْنِ صَّامِت الأَنْصَاريِّ, romanized: Maslama ibn Mukhallad ibn Ṣāmit al-Anṣārī) was one of the companions of the Prophet and active in Egypt in the decades after its conquest.

== Biography ==
He was born in 616 or 620, and participated in the Muslim conquest of Egypt, remaining in the country until his death. He was an adherent of Caliph Uthman, and refused to recognize the succession of Caliph Ali after Uthman's assassination. Consequently, he was one of the leaders of the pro-Uthman party, under Mu'awiya ibn Hudayj, and participated in their revolt against the Alid governor Muhammad ibn Abi Hudhayfa in 657, until the Umayyad governor of Syria, Mu'awiya ibn Abi Sufyan, reimposed order. As open war broke out between Ali and Mu'awiya, he opposed Ali's appointment of Muhammad ibn Abi Bakr as governor of Egypt, and it is probable that he participated in the Syrian invasion under Amr ibn al-As that led to Ibn Abi Bakr's defeat, capture and execution in the summer of that year.

Maslama served loyally under Amr ibn al-As, who was governor of Egypt until his death in January 664, but remained on the sidelines under his three successors, Abd Allah ibn Amr al-As, Utba ibn Abi Sufyan and Uqba ibn Amir. Finally, in 667/8, Maslama himself petitioned Caliph Mu'awiya I, and was appointed governor of Egypt. He held the post until 670 according to al-Tabari, though other sources report that he governed the country continuously until his death on 9 April 682. Little is known of is tenure, except that he was active in the wars against the Byzantine Empire, sending regular expeditions against them, and rebuilt the Mosque of Amr ibn al-As in Fustat, to which he added minarets. Otherwise his period of office seems to have been one of domestic tranquility. Some sources claim that Maslama was also responsible for the Muslim campaigns in Ifriqiya and the Maghreb in general, although others insist that these areas did not come under his authority until ca. 675; at any rate, he replaced Uqba ibn Nafi, who had been in charge in Ifriqiya until then, with Abu al-Muhajir Dinar in 671 or in 675.

Maslama remained a firm adherent of the Umayyads to the last, and when Mu'awiya died in 680, he immediately recognized his son, Yazid I, as his successor; he reportedly threatened even Amr ibn al-As's son Abd Allah, another Companion and respected hadith scholar, with execution when he objected.

== Sources ==
- Kennedy, Hugh (1998). "Egypt as a province in the Islamic caliphate, 641–868". In Petry, Carl F. (ed.). Cambridge History of Egypt, Volume One: Islamic Egypt, 640–1517. Cambridge: Cambridge University Press. pp. 62–85. ISBN 0-521-47137-0.
- Bosworth, C. E.; van Donzel, E. & Pellat, Ch., eds. (1991). "Maslama b. Mukhallad". The Encyclopaedia of Islam, Second Edition. Volume VI: Mahk–Mid. Leiden: E. J. Brill. p. 740. ISBN 978-90-04-08112-3.

Preceded by Uqba ibn Amir	Governor of Egypt; 667–682	Succeeded by Muhammad ibn Maslama
