= Uqba ibn Amir =

Governor of Egypt and a Sahabi

Governor of Egypt
- In office 665–667
- Monarch: Mu'awiya I
- Preceded by: Utba ibn Abi Sufyan
- Succeeded by: Maslama ibn Mukhallad

Personal details
- Died: 677/678 Fustat
- Parent: Amir al-Juhani (father)

Uqba ibn Amir al-Juhani (Arabic: عقبة بن عامر الجهني, romanized: ʿUqba ibn ʿĀmir al-Juhanī; died 677/78) was a companion of the Islamic prophet Muhammad, and a military commander. He participated in the conquest of Syria and in the conquest of Egypt. During the First Fitna, he joined the Umayyad emir of Syria, Mu'awiya ibn Abi Sufyan, and fought in his ranks against the forces of Caliph Ali at the Battle of Siffin.

After Mu'awiya became caliph in 661, he appointed Uqba ibn Amir as the govenror of Egypt in 665, and dismissed him in 667. Uqba died in Egypt, and next to his grave in Cairo is the Uqba ibn Amir Mosque.

== Life ==
Uqba ibn Amir hailed from the Juhayna tribe, a branch of the Quda'a tribal confederation resident across Syria and northwestern Arabia. His full name is Uqba ibn Amir ibn Abs ibn Amr ibn Adi ibn Amr ibn Rifa’ah ibn Mudawwa’ah ibn Adi ibn Uthman ibn al-Rabi’ah ibn Rashdan ibn Qays ibn Juhaynah Abu Abs, also known as Abu Hammad al-Juhani.

=== Upbringing and becoming a Muslim ===
Uqba ibn Amir was among the first to pledge allegiance to the Islamic prophet Muhammad upon his migration to Medina in the first year of the Hijra. At the time, Uqba was a young man tending sheep for his family. When he heard of the arrival of Muhammad, he went to pledge allegiance to him. Ibn Hajar said:

And in Sahih Muslim, on the authority of Qays ibn Abi Hazim, on the authority of Uqbah ibn Amir, he said: The Messenger of God, may God bless him and grant him peace, came to Medina while I was tending my sheep. I left them and then went to him and said, "Pledge allegiance to me," so he pledged allegiance to me for the migration.

He became a well-known companion of the Islamic prophet Muhammad and served as the latter's muleteer. Uqba was also a poet and became known for his writing skills. He developed a reputation as an early reader of the Quran. and possessed a version of the Muslim holy book that was different than the version descended from Caliph Uthman (r. 644–656). His recension of the Quran fell into oblivion after the Umayyad governor of Egypt, Abd al-Aziz ibn Marwan, had another codex produced in accordance with the Uthmanid canon. Uqba is credited with the transmission of 55 or 57 hadiths (traditions of Muhammad). He was also famous for his understanding of jurisprudence, including inheritance laws. Ibn Yunus said:

He was a reader knowledgeable in the inheritance laws and jurisprudence, eloquent of tongue, a poet and writer, and he is one of those who collected the Qur’an; and his copy of the Qur’an is in Egypt until now in his handwriting. I saw it with “Ali ibn al-Hasan ibn Qudayd” in a different composition than that in the copy of Uthman.

His biography in Siyar A'lam al-Nubala' states:

Uqba ibn Amir al-Juhani: The imam, the reciter, the companion of the Prophet. He was a knowledgeable, eloquent reciter, a jurist, a scholar of Islamic law, and a poet of great stature.

== Conquests of the Levant ==
Uqba ibn Amir and the Juhayna tribe were among the vanguard of the Arab Islamic army that set out for the conquest of Syria in Safar 13 AH. Ibn Sa'd said:

When the Messenger of God, may God bless him and grant him peace, passed away, and Abu Bakr called the people to the Levant, Uqba ibn Amir went out and witnessed the conquests of the Levant.

Uqba ibn Amir and his tribe were in the fourth army, which was led by Amr ibn al-As, in the conquest of Gaza and parts of Palestine. Then the four armies met in the Battle of the Yarmuk and other battles.

During the conquest of Damascus in Rajab 14 AH, Uqba ibn Amir was one of the Companions who took over and entered the city. Ibn Hajar said: Uqba ibn Amir witnessed the conquests and was the messenger to Umar about the conquest of Damascus.

== Conquests of Egypt ==
Uqba ibn Amir contributed significantly to the Arab conquest of Egypt, along with Amr ibn al-'As. He played a prominent role in the conquest of Bahnasa in Upper Egypt and its south. Al-Waqidi said:

In the heart - the heart of the army - were Amr, Abd al-Rahman ibn Abi Bakr al-Siddiq, Abd Allah ibn Umar ibn al-Khattab, Uqba ibn Amir al-Juhani, and the rest of the Companions, the princes and standard-bearers who witnessed the battles with the Messenger of God, may God bless him and grant him peace.

Uqba was one of the commanders of the Arab Islamic army in fighting Patriarch Ptolemy and the Romans who were with him in Dahshur and the city of Bahnasa. Al-Waqidi said:

Abdullah ibn Awn told us: Jabir ibn Sinan told us on the authority of Uqba ibn Amir, who said: The Romans and Christians were throwing stones and arrows from the top of the wall, and the Muslims encountered a great matter from the enemy of God, Al-Batayyus, the likes of which they had never seen before. The first to reach them was Al-Batayyus, may God curse him, so the Muslims endured it with the patience of the noble.

Uqba ibn Amir was at the head of the Islamic force at Bab al-Qundus in the city of Bahnasa, culminating in the conquest of that city and the fall of the last Roman stronghold. The banner of Islam was raised in Upper Egypt, and this occurred at the end of the reign of Caliph Umar.

Uqba was with Amr ibn al-As when he conquered Fustat, and was then directed by Amr to the rest of the villages in the lower reaches of the country, conquering them and making peace with the people of their villages on a similar basis to the peace treaty of Fustat.

== Service under Mu'awiya ==
During the First Fitna, he was an active supporter of Mu'awiya I, future founder of the Umayyad Caliphate, against Caliph Ali (r. 656–661). Mu'awiya became caliph in 661 and appointed Uqba as the governor of Egypt in 664, replacing the caliph's deceased brother, Utba ibn Abi Sufyan. According to the 9th-century historian al-Tabari, in 668/69, Uqba led the Arab troops of Egypt alongside the troops of Medina in a naval raid against Byzantine territory. He was replaced as governor by Maslama ibn Mukhallad al-Ansari in 667.

== Last advices to his sons ==
When Uqba fell ill with a fatal illness, he gathered his sons and advised them, saying: O my sons, I forbid you from three things, so adhere to them: Do not accept a hadith from the Messenger of God, may God bless him and grant him peace, except from a trustworthy person, do not borrow money even if you wear an abaya (a garment open at the front), and do not write poetry, for it will distract your hearts from the Qur’an.

== Death ==
He died in Egypt in 677/78. An honorary tomb was built on his grave in the cemetery of Qarafa al-Kubra near Fustat. During the Mamluk period in the 14th century, it was one of several ziyarat (Muslim pilgrimage sites) visited by Egyptian Muslims.

== Bibliography ==
- Kennedy, Hugh (1998). "Egypt as a Province in the Islamic Caliphate, 641–868". In Petry, Carl F. (ed.). Cambridge History of Egypt, Volume One: Islamic Egypt, 640–1517. Cambridge: Cambridge University Press. pp. 62–85. ISBN 0-521-47137-0.
- Landau-Tasseron, Ella, ed. (1998). The History of al-Ṭabarī, Volume XXXIX: Biographies of the Prophet's Companions and their Successors: al-Ṭabarī's Supplement to his History. SUNY Series in Near Eastern Studies. Albany, New York: State University of New York Press. ISBN 978-0-7914-2819-1.
- Madelung, Wilferd (1992). Religious and Ethnic Movements in Medieval Islam. Variorum. ISBN 9780860783107.
- Morony, Michael G., ed. (1987). The History of al-Ṭabarī, Volume XVIII: Between Civil Wars: The Caliphate of Muʿāwiyah, 661–680 A.D./A.H. 40–60. SUNY Series in Near Eastern Studies. Albany, New York: State University of New York Press. ISBN 978-0-87395-933-9.
- Taylor, Christopher S. (1999). In the Vicinity of the Righteous: Ziyāra and the Veneration of Muslim Saints in Late Medieval Egypt. Leiden, Boston and Koln: Brill. ISBN 90-04-11046-1.
- Tillier, Mathieu (2022). "Une tradition coranique égyptienne ? Le codex de ʿUqba b. ʿĀmir al-Ǧuhanī". Studia Islamica. Vol. 117. pp. 38–637.

Preceded by Utba ibn Abi Sufyan	Governor of Egypt; 664–669	Succeeded by Maslama ibn Mukhallad al-Ansari
