= Sidi Okba Mosque =

Mosque in Sidi Okba, Algeria

- مسجد سيدي عقبة
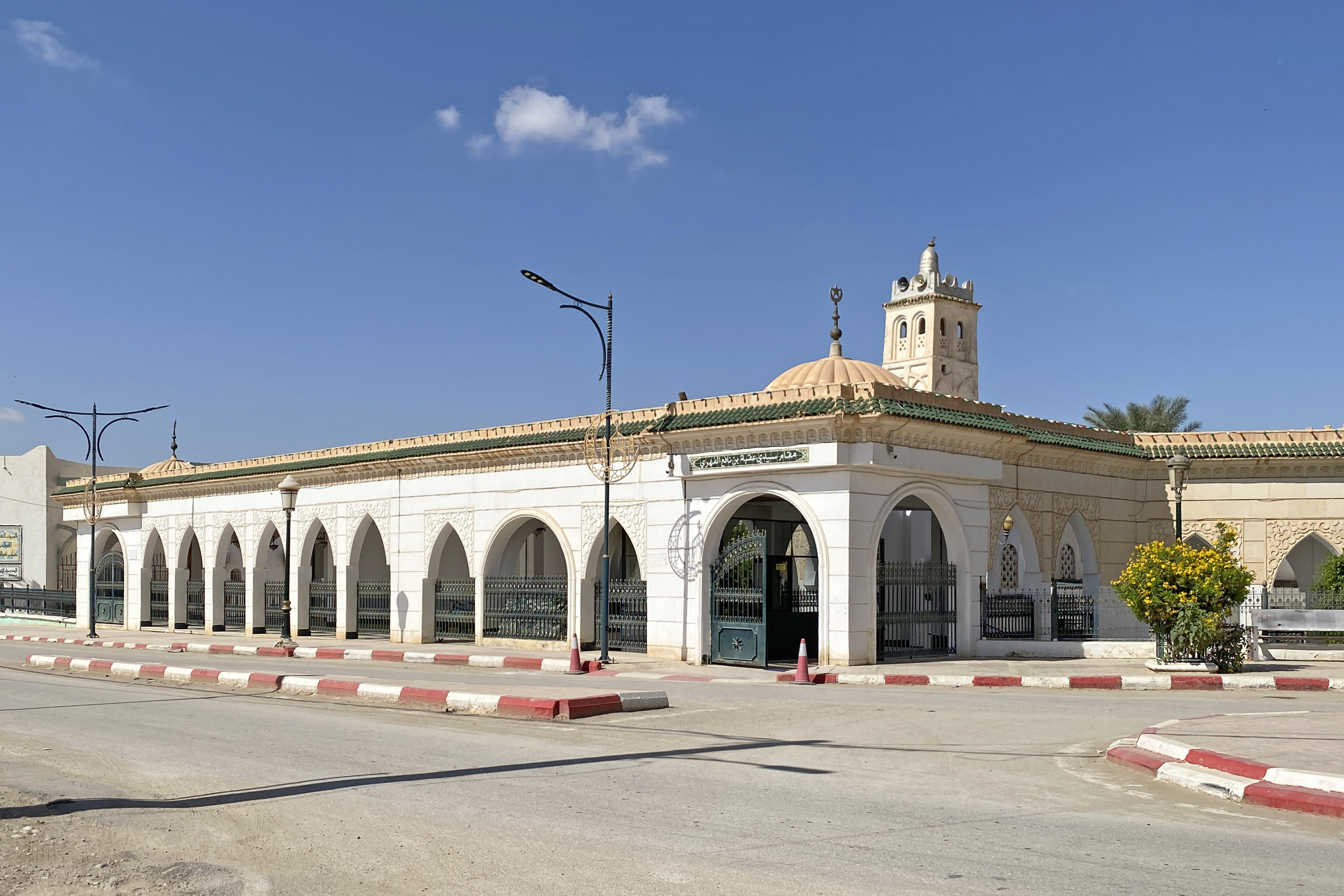

Religion
- Affiliation: Islam
- Ecclesiastical or organisational status: Mosque; Mausoleum
- Status: Active

Location
- Location: Sidi Okba
- Country: Algeria
- Interactive map of Sidi Okba Mosque
- Coordinates: 34°44′56″N 5°53′59″E

Architecture
- Style: Moorish
- Completed: 686 (tomb); c. 1025, 1800, 2009 (renovations)

The Sidi Okba Mosque (Arabic: مسجد سيدي عقبة, romanized: Masjid Sīdī ʻUqbah) is a mosque in the village of Sidi Okba, near Biskra, Algeria. A mausoleum was first established here in 686 to house the remains of Uqba ibn Nafi, a companion of the Islamic prophet Muhammad and one of the prominent commanders of the Muslim conquest of the Maghreb, making it one of the oldest Muslim monuments in Algeria. The mosque was built around the tomb and has been renovated many times over the centuries. Since 2009, the historic building has been integrated into a much larger modern religious complex.

== History ==
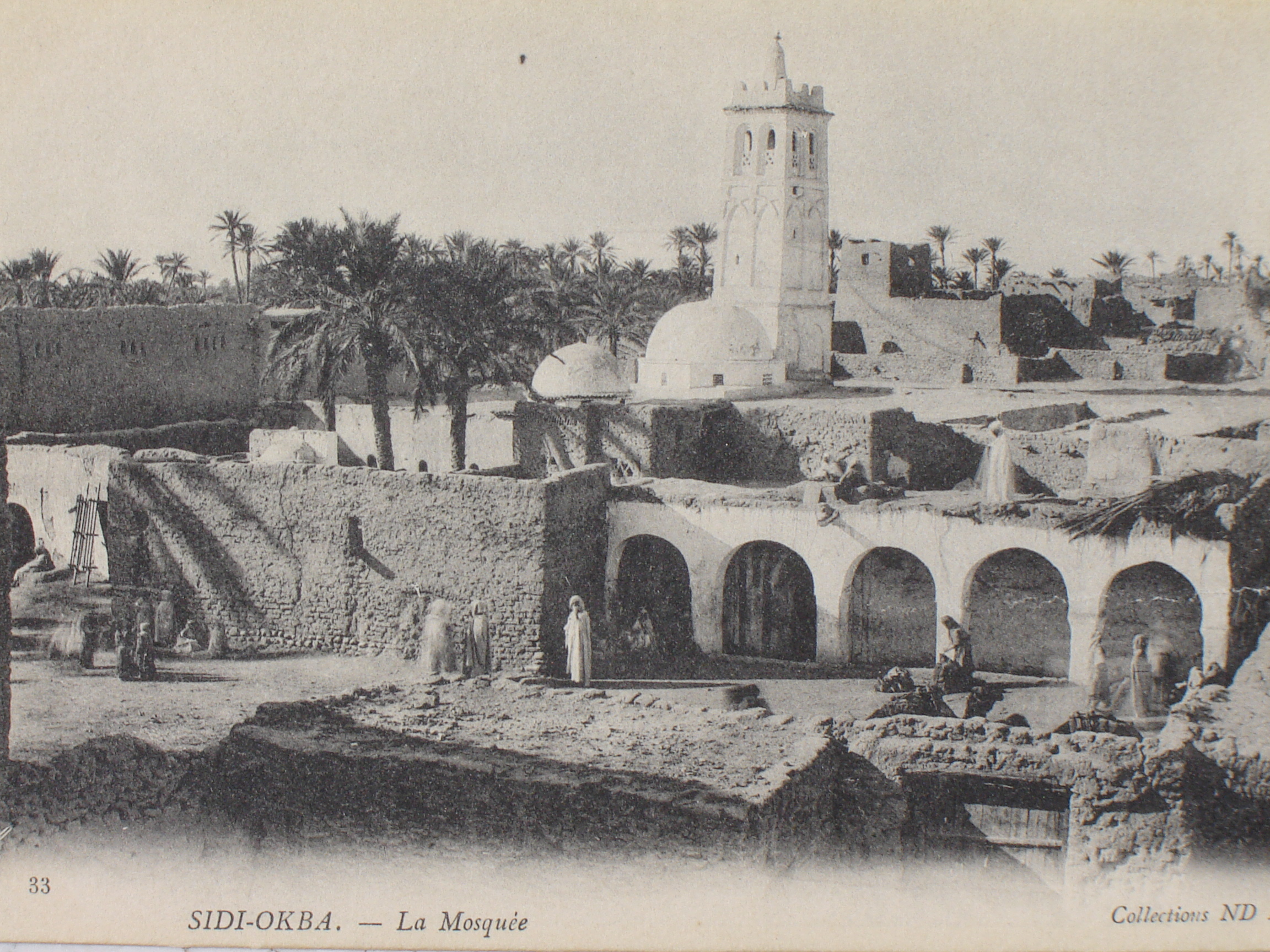
The mosque exterior, c. 1900

ʻUqbah ibn Nāfiʻ, on his return from the victorious Battle of Vescera in the Atlas Mountains, was killed by the army of the Berber Christian king Kusayla ibn Lamzah in an ambush outside the town of Thouda in 683 CE. He was buried in the village of Sidi Okba, and later the mosque was built on top of it for commemoration. It is not exactly recorded who built the mosque; some consider that it was the followers of Uqba who were captured during the battle, and later redeemed by the judges in Tunis from the prison. Commander Zuhayr ibn Qays sent them back along with other Muslims to Thouda, where they built the mosque.

The building was not constructed all at once and was likely remodeled and expanded several times. The tomb, the oldest part, probably dates from 686, making it one of the first known Muslim monuments in Algeria. The decorated cedar-wood doors of the tomb have been dated by Georges Marçais to the first half of the 11th century (c. 1025) during the Zirid period, based on a stylistic comparison with Zirid woodwork in the Great Mosque of Kairouan and with contemporary inscriptions on stelae found in Tunisia. This likely indicates a major renovation at this time.

A zawiya was added to the mosque in 1665. Other inscriptions found in the mosque likely indicate the dates of further repairs or expansions. One inscription dates the mosque's mihrab from 1214 AH (1799/1800 CE) and another inscription on a wooden plaque dates from 1215 AH (1800/1801 CE). These inscriptions also name Muhammad ibn 'Umar al-Tunisi as the sponsor of the work.

The mosque was renovated in 1969 and again in 1996. In 2009, the old mosque was integrated into a larger modern religious complex with a new prayer hall and other facilities. The historic prayer hall no longer functions as a mosque.

== Architecture ==
The building is designed in a very simple hypostyle manner, similar to the earliest mosque built by Muhammad in Medina. The mostly flat roof of the prayer hall is supported by undecorated horseshoe arches held up by whitewashed columns, some of which are made of palm tree trunks. There are two domes: one above the mausoleum and the other in front of the mihrab. The mihrab is covered by a semi-dome and is decorated with stucco carved in simple and irregular interlace patterns, including engaged columns with capitals carved with grooves and stylized palm-tree motifs. The mausoleum occupies the southwest corner of the mosque. The original minaret has a square shaft whose exterior is decorated with niches and intersecting blind arches. Its top is crowned with decorative merlons.

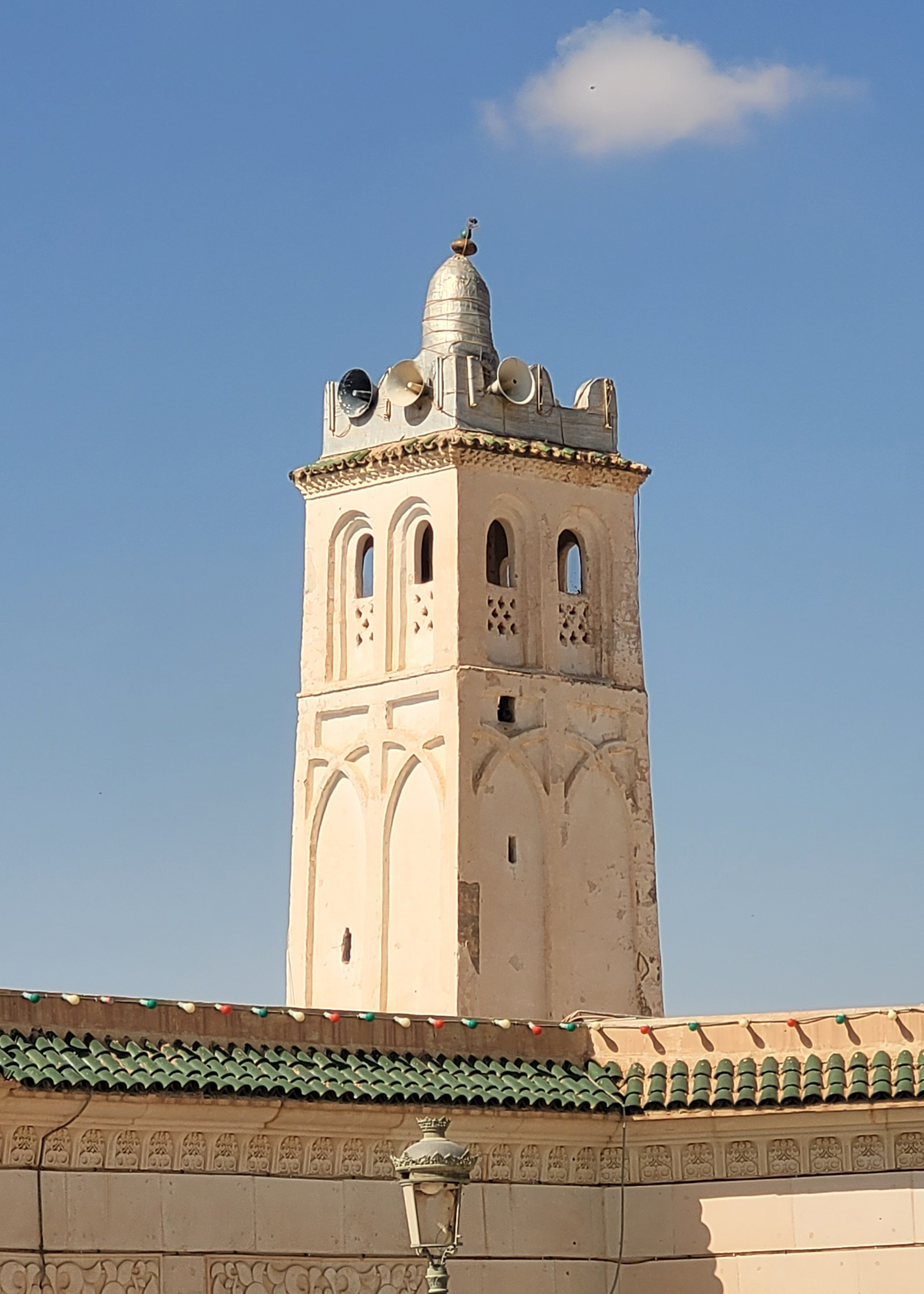
The original minaret

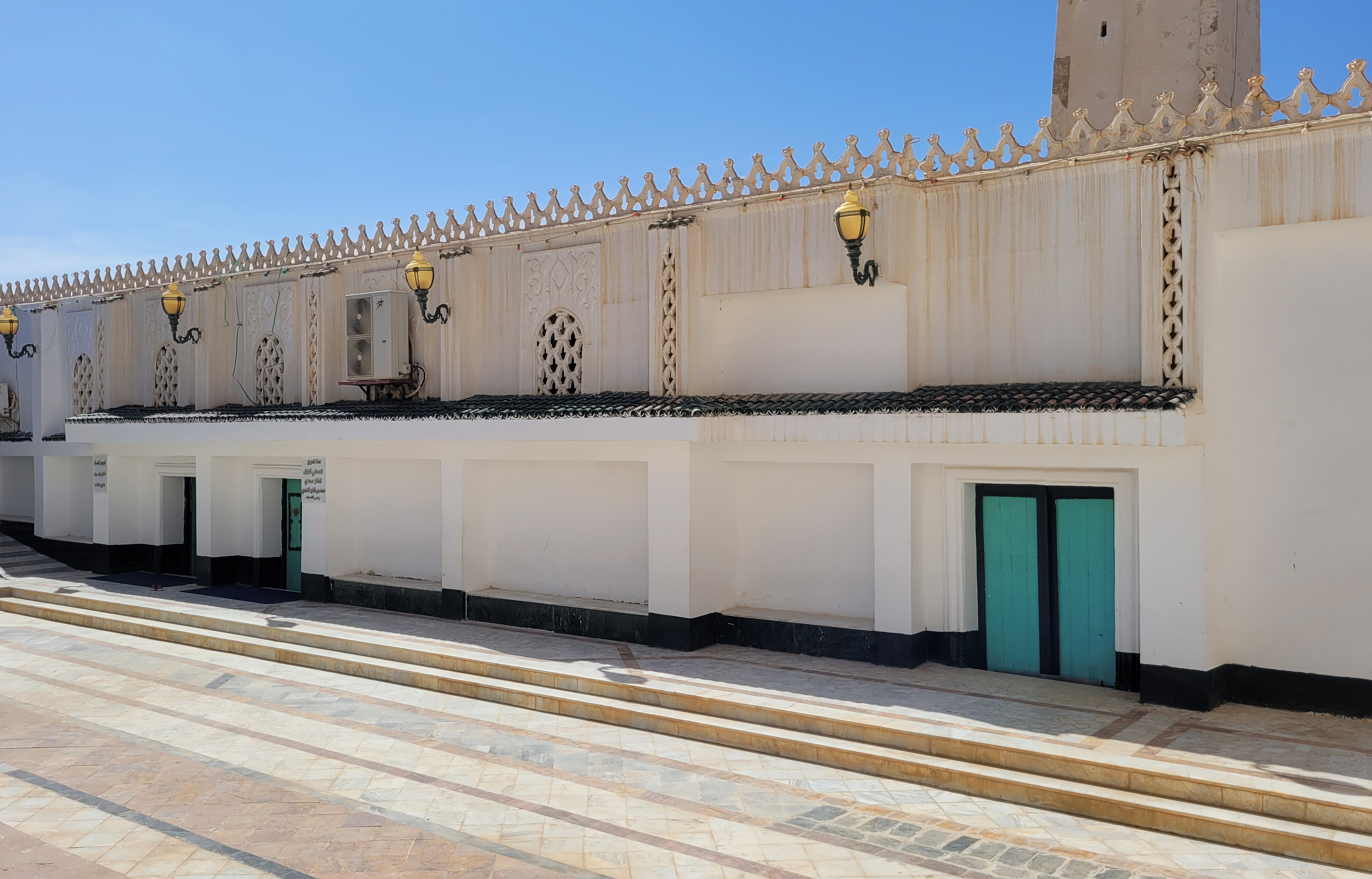
Exterior of the historic mosque, seen from an inner courtyard of the modern complex

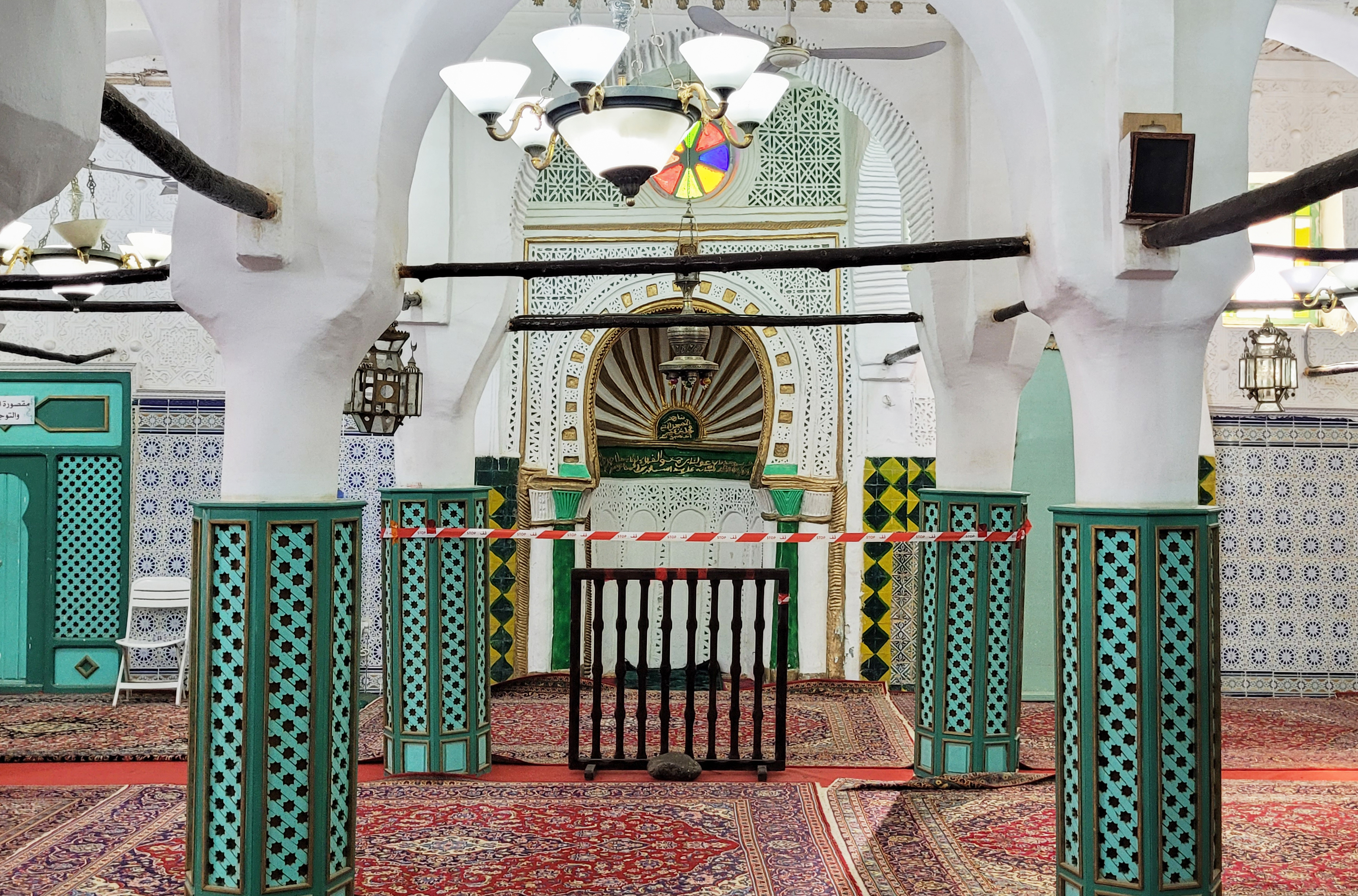
The historic prayer hall and mihrab

The modern Islamic complex added in the 21st century includes a new mosque building with a prayer hall large enough for 5,000 worshipers. The old mosque has been connected architecturally with the rest of the complex via additional porticoes surrounding it. The complex also includes a Quranic school, library, conference room, and dormitories.

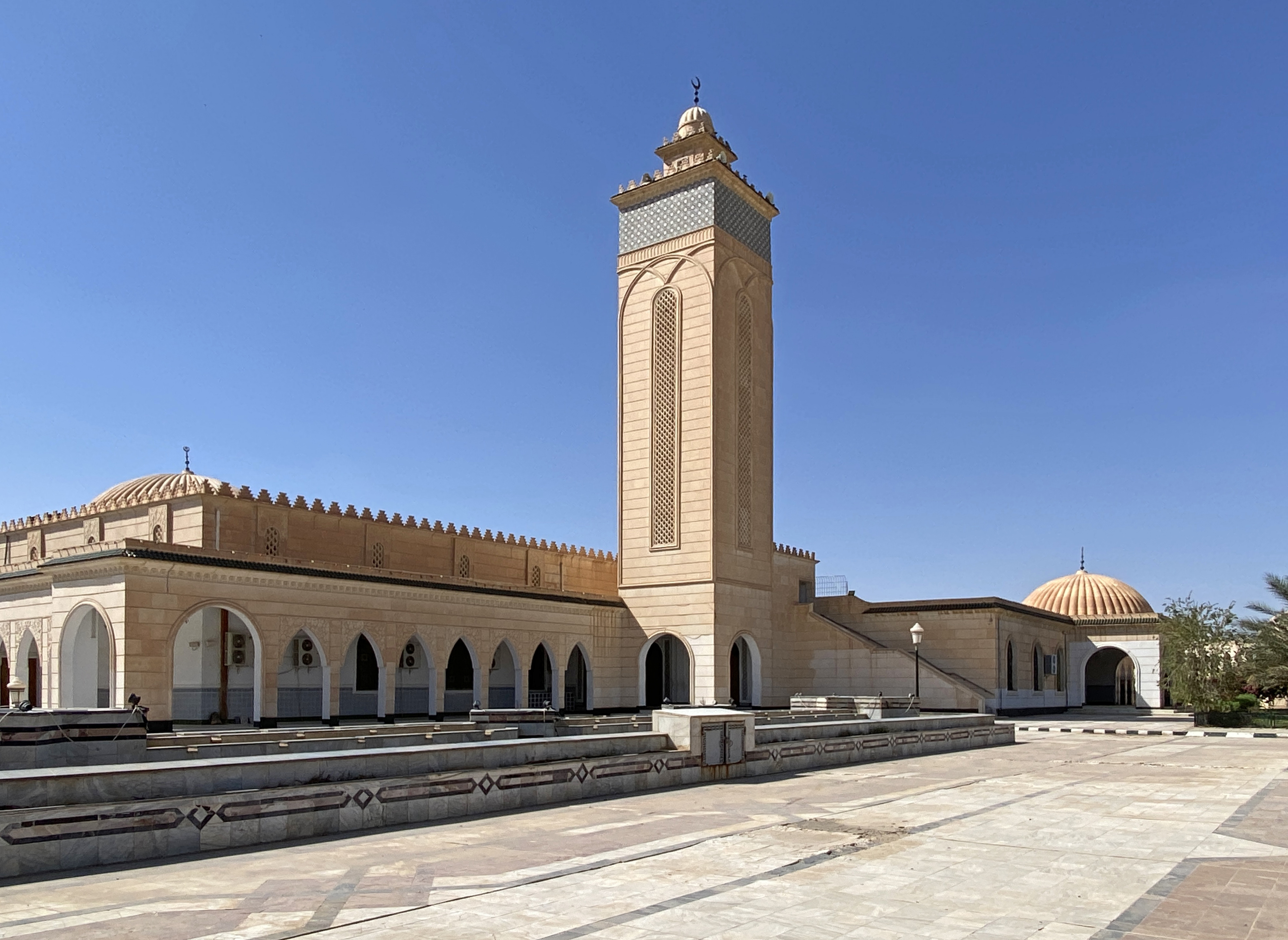
The modern mosque added in the 21st century

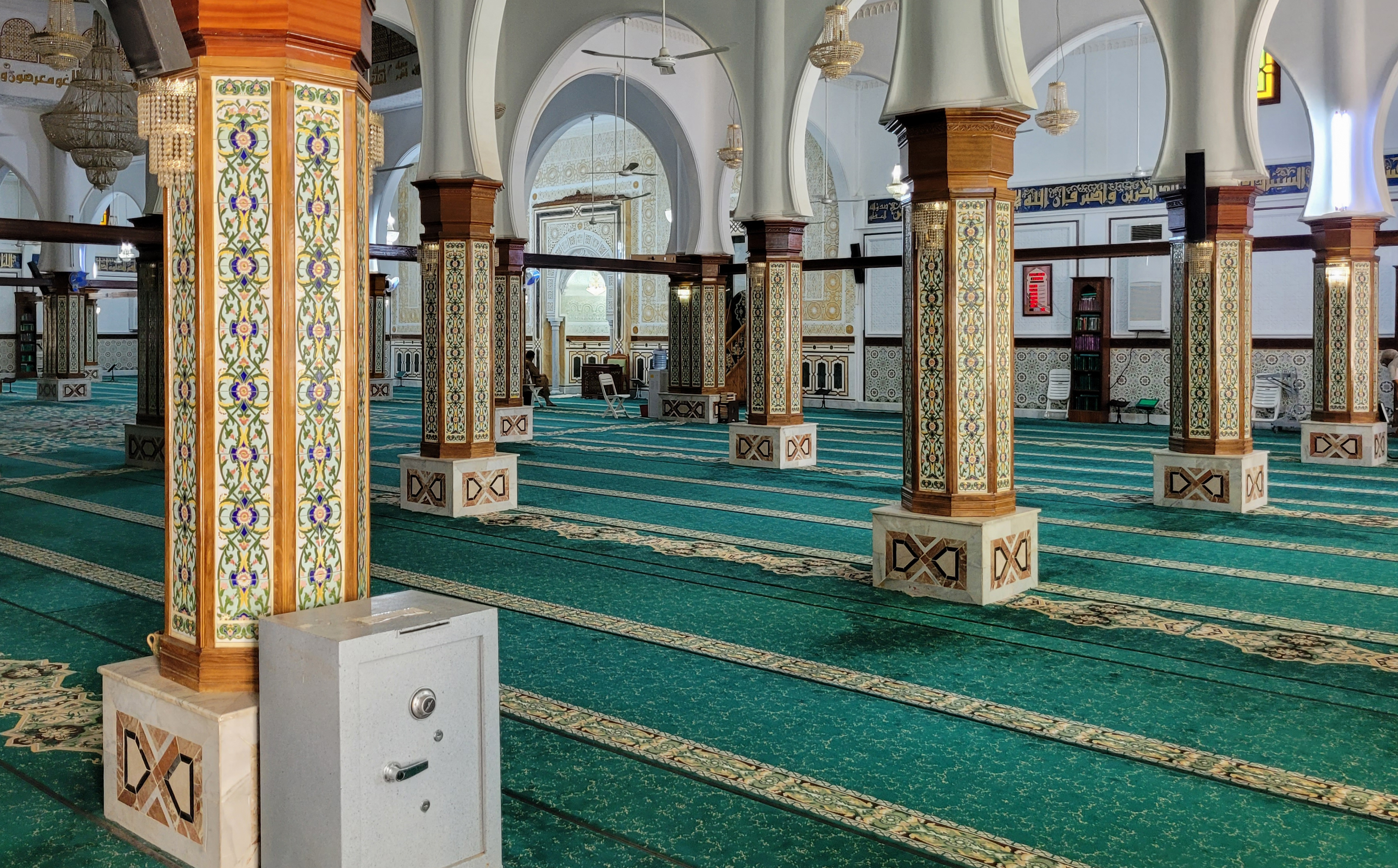
Interior of the modern prayer hall

== See also ==
- Islam in Algeria
- List of mosques in Algeria
- List of oldest mosques in Africa
