= Battle of Vescera =

680battle in modern-day Algeria between Umayyad forces and a Berber-Byzantine coalition

Coordinates: 34°50′N 5°44′E

- Part of the Muslim conquest of the Maghreb (Arab–Byzantine wars)
Date	682 CE
Location	Thabudeos, near Vescera
Result	Berber and Byzantine victory

Belligerents
Umayyad Caliphate	Kingdom of Altava

Commanders and leaders
Uqba ibn Nafi †; Abu al-Muhajir Dinar †	Kusaila

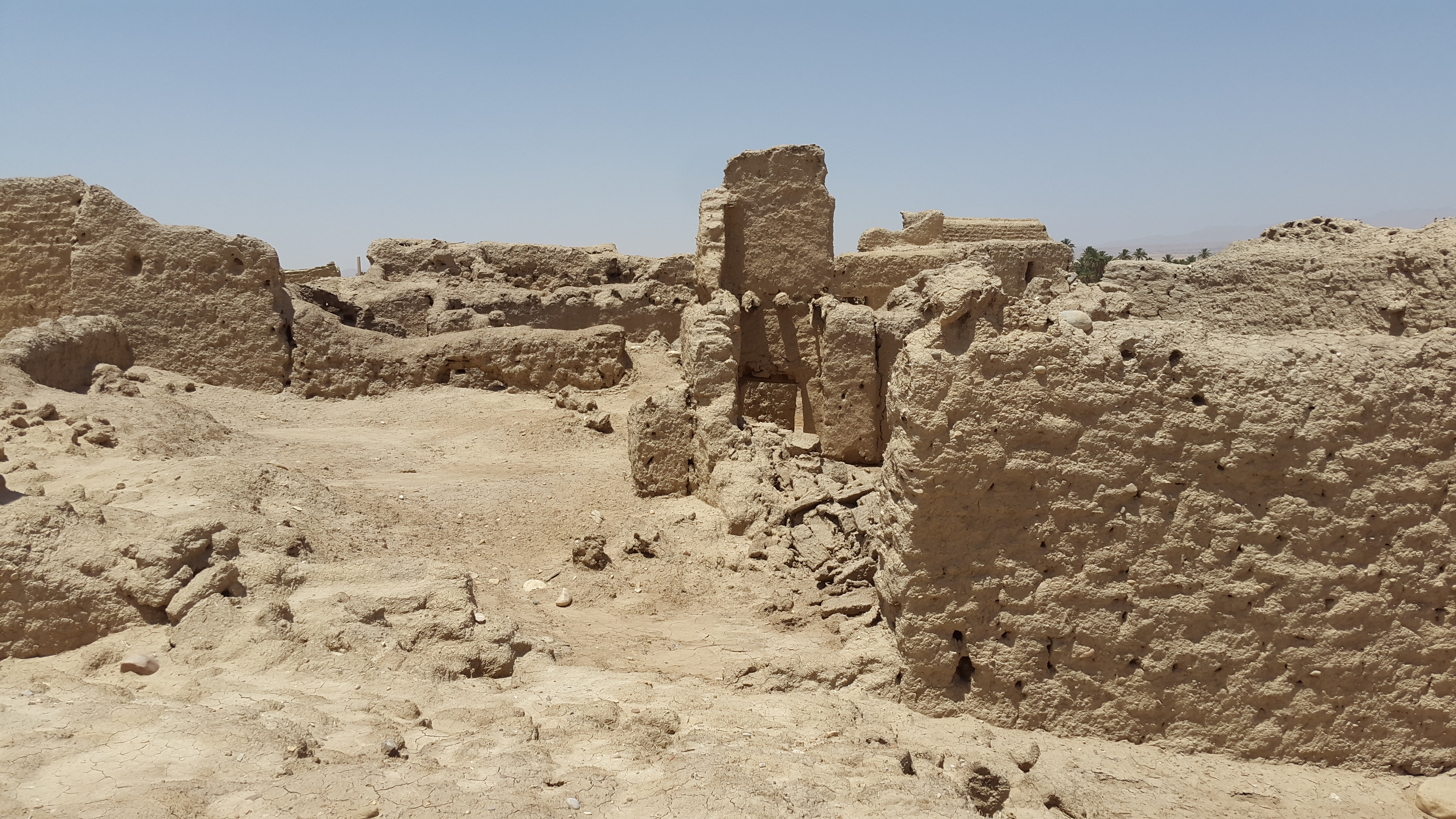
The ruins of the Tehouda battle site

The Battle of Vescera (modern Biskra in Algeria) was fought in 682 or 683 between the Romano-Berbers of King Kusaila and their Byzantine allies from the Exarchate of Africa against an Umayyad Arab army under Uqba ibn Nafi (the founder of Kairouan). Uqba ibn Nafi had led his men in an expedition across north Africa, eventually reaching the Atlantic Ocean and marching as far south as the Draa and Sous rivers. On his return, he was ambushed by the Berber-Byzantine coalition at Tehouda (Thabudeos) south Vescera, defeated, and killed.
