= Tabuda =

Thouda Tabuda
- Town
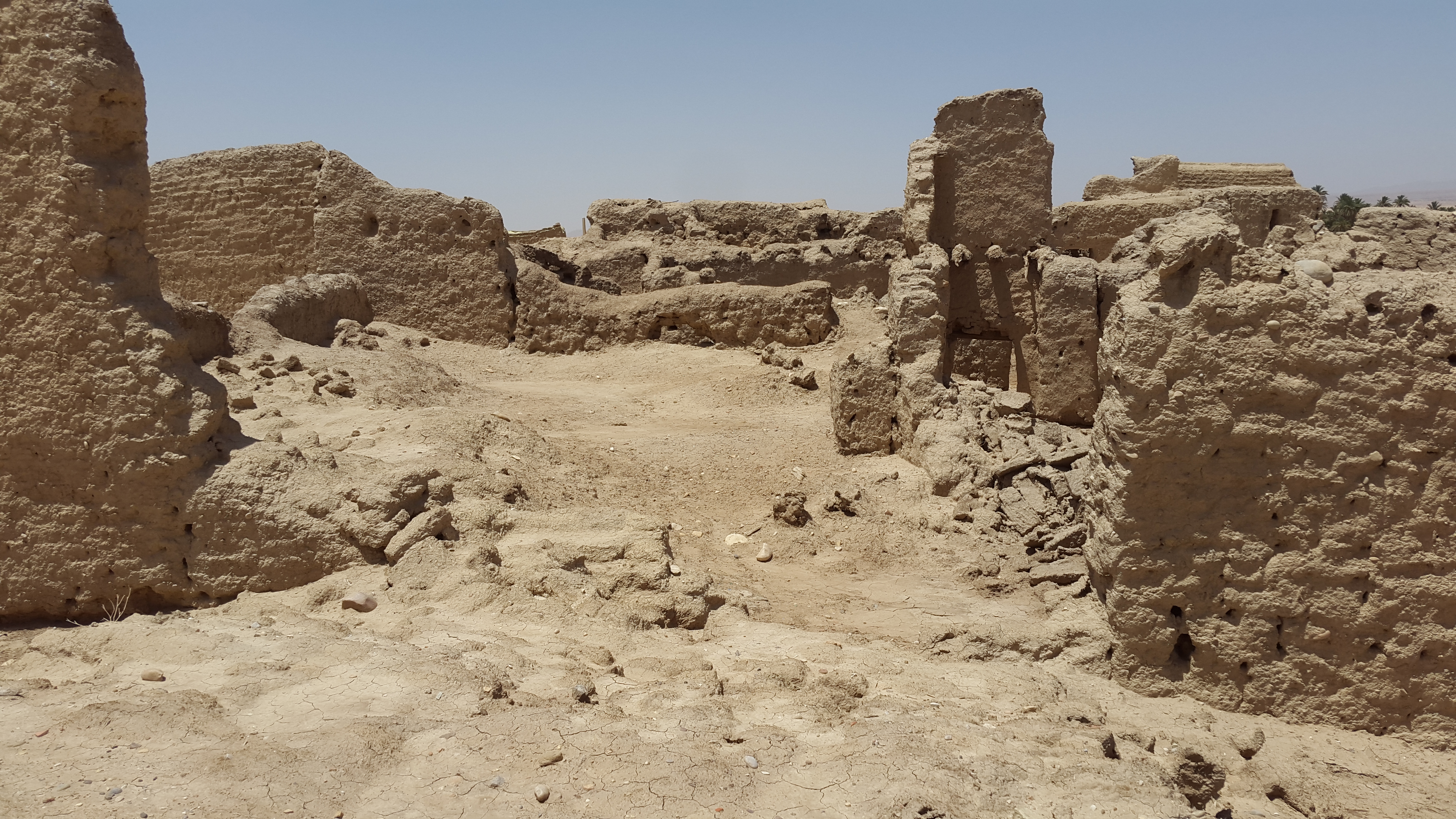
- The ruins of Thouda, Biskra, Algeria

- Location in Algeria
- Coordinates: 34°50′N 5°44′E
- Elevation: 87 m (285 ft)
- Time zone: UTC+1 (+1)
- Postal code: 07000

Tabuda, Thouda or Tahuda (former Roman Thabudeos) was a Roman–Berber colonia in the province of Numidia. A key town in the Roman, Byzantine and Vandal empires, it is identifiable with the stone ruins at the oasis adjacent to the village of Sidi Okba, Algeria.

== Bishopric ==
The Diocese of Tabuda (Tabudensis) is a suppressed and titular see of the Roman Catholic Church in the province of Numidia.

Known Bishops

- Laurent Tétrault, (13 Nov 1947 Appointed – 14 Mar 1951 Died)
- Teodor Bensch (26 Apr 1951 Appointed – 1 Dec 1956)
- Antonio Añoveros Ataún † (25 Aug 1952 Appointed – 2 Apr 1964)
- Teodor Bensch † (21 Sep 1954 Ordained Bishop – 1 Dec 1956)
- James Louis Flaherty † (8 Aug 1966 Appointed – 9 Aug 1975)
- Giovanni Innocenzo Martinelli, O.F.M. (3 May 1985 – 30 Dec 2019)
- Elias Richard Lorenzo, O.S.B. (27 Feb 2020 - )

== Bibliography ==
- Pierre Morizot, Regard sur les inscriptions de Thouda du XVIIIe siècle à nos jours, Volume 154, Issue 2, Feb 2016
