= Italian colonial architecture =

Italian colonial architecture includes a variety of architectural styles utilized by the colonial authorities and colonists of the Italian Empire.

The architectural styles used in the Italian colonies from the founding of Italian Eritrea in 1885 until the ascent of the National Fascist Party were heterogeneous and generally reflective of the architectural scene in Italy, albeit with an orientalist slant. The expansion of the empire under Fascist administration eventually demanded the creation of a "colonial style" based on the combination of Italian and appropriated local vernacular styles. This development of a "colonial style" in the early 1930s made various incarnations of Rationalism the preponderant style in Italy's African and European colonies until their demise in World War II.

== Eritrea ==
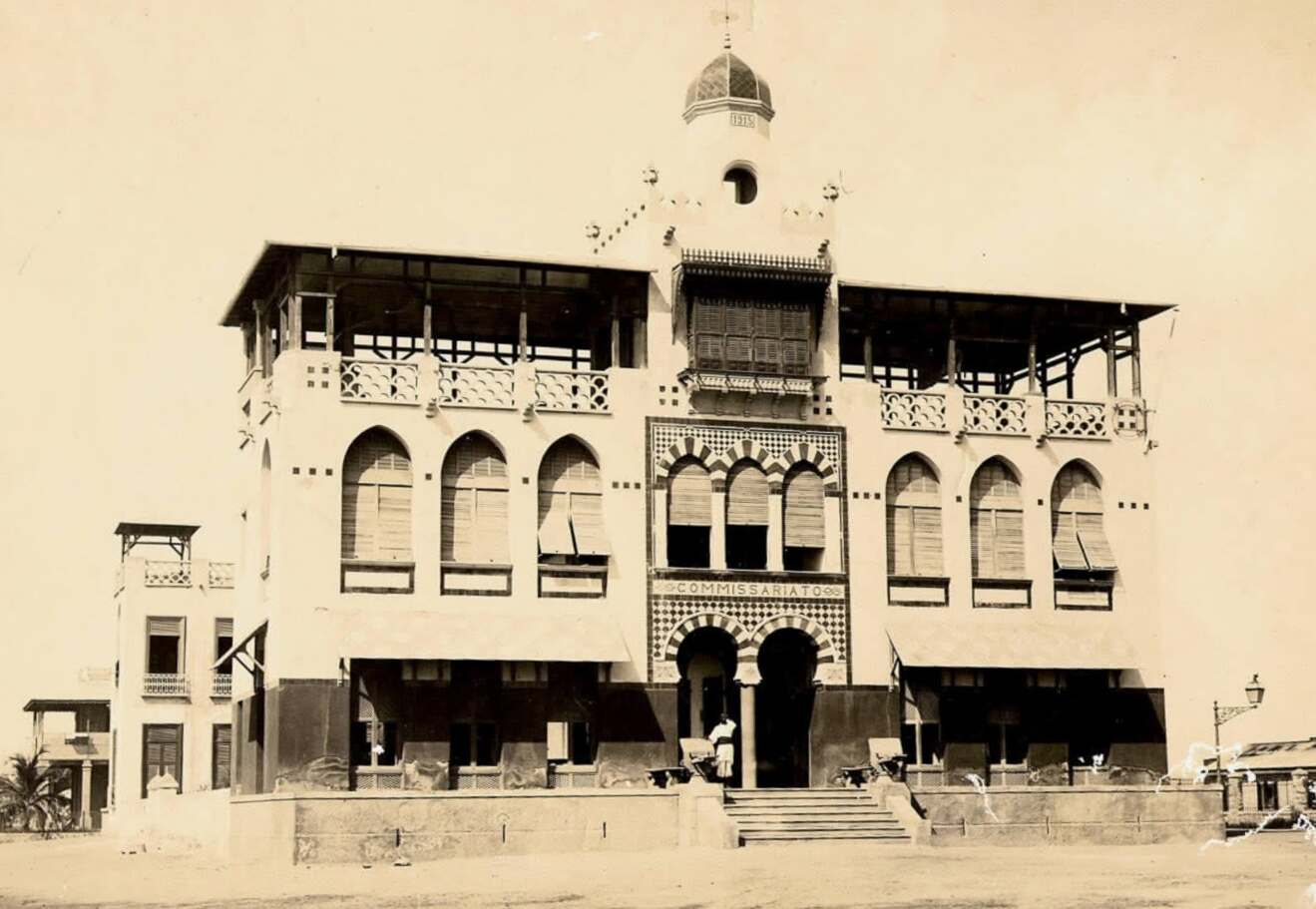
Massawa's Commisariat (1915) is an example of orientalizing neo-Moorish architecture in Italy's empire

Eritrea was the earliest Italian colonial undertaking, and contains what is arguably the most notable collection of Italian colonial architecture, the city of Asmara.

=== Pre-fascist ===
Massawa was the first city to come under Italian rule (in 1885), but early buildings there mostly reflected its role as a functional commercial depot and staging point for further expansion. Early colonial officials expressed disdain for the predominance of local "Red Sea" styles in Massawa. Italian styles only began to flower in Asmara, which became a center of administration following the official founding of the colony in 1890. The early buildings built by the Italians in Asmara were expressly Italian in style, reflecting the styles then dominant in the metropole, including neo-rennaisance, neo-romanesque, and art-nouveau. Asmara also hosted a handful of alpine chalets, in a nod to its elevation. Thus, Asmara's European quarters were very visually similar to small cities within Italy. Syncretism, let alone the development of a new colonial style, was generally absent in Asmara, with the notable exception of Enda Mariam Cathedral, a structure built for local Eritreans which incorporated references to local house-building styles.

Despite this stylistic eclecticism, Asmara's urban planning was strictly managed by colonial authorities. Governor Giuseppe Salvago Raggi tasked planner Odoardo Cavagnari with designing an orthogonal street grid centered on broad avenues, which strictly separated the various groups living in the city, i.e. settlers, Arabs, Jews, and Indians, and locals.

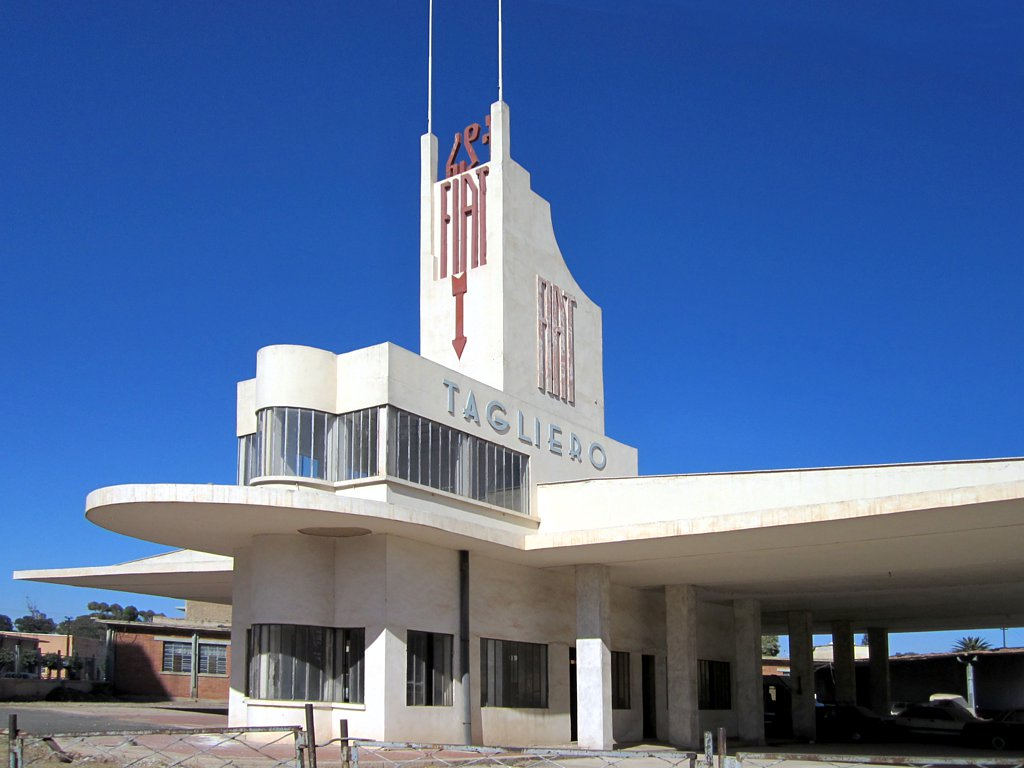
The Fiat Tagliero Building (1938) is one of Asmara's most famous modernist buildings.

=== Fascist ===
In 1931, Asmara had a European population of 3,600, with 20,000 Eritreans living on the outskirts. Fascist hopes to make Eritrea a base for further expansion into Ethiopia resulted in a steep increase in population to 98,000, and the original plan had to be altered and expanded. The city's new planner, Vittorio Cafiero, held to Cavagnari's grid but expanded it and made segregation more strict. From 1935 onward, the eclectic mix of styles was discarded in favor of fascist Rationalism. This even entailed the demolition of some pre-fascist buildings, including the Governor's Palace. The development of Rationalism and adjacent styles was at least partially on the initiative of Italian builders in the city who sought to portray Eritrea as a desirable place to do business. However, planning and major construction was strictly controlled from Rome, where the government sought to regularize the Italian presence in East Africa in anticipation of a consolidation of the colonies. The efforts of colonial architects to completely evict native Eritreans from Asmara's center was stymied by Governor Daodiace, although other segregation initiatives were implemented in the 30s. In the mid-30s, Italian authorities in Eritrea and newly-conquered Ethiopia invited Italian architects working in Libya to contribute to plans of model villages for future "demographic colonization" in the Eritrean countryside, although the outbreak of war hindered these plans. Asmara's Italian core was designated a UNESCO World Heritage Site in 2017 as an "exceptional example of early modernist urbanism at the beginning of the 20th century and its application in an African context.".

== Libya ==
=== Pre-fascist ===
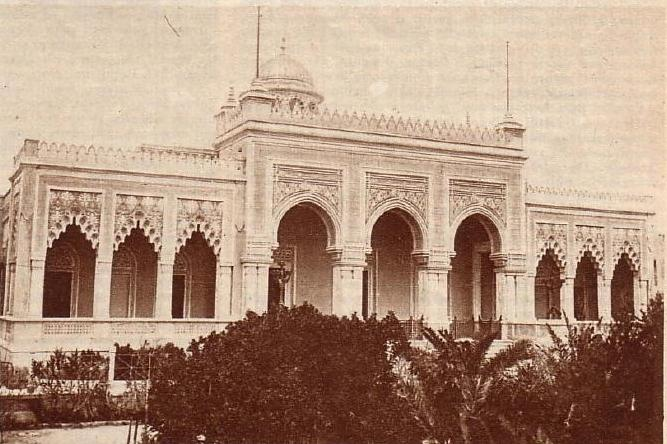
The Palazzo Littorio in Benghazi (1923) was built in a rich "oriental" style.

A colony on the Mediterranean was seen as crucial to greater colonial aims, and the conquest of Libya in 1912 was met with great celebration by pro-colonial Italians, who identified it as Italy's "fourth coast". Unlike Eritrea, Libya's Mediterranean setting and Roman heritage made it familiar to incoming authorities (and, later, colonists). Some of the earliest architectural projects undertaken in Libya, in fact, revolved around the restoration of Roman ruins, including the Arch of Marcus Aurelius in Tripoli. Roman colonial towns like Leptis Magna signified a continuity between the Roman and fascist projects, and were given pride of place for colonial nation-building and tourism. Like in Eritrea, early Italian architecture in Libya was reflective of the metropole with certain orientalist adaptations, and encompassed a wide variety of styles, mainly neo-Moorish, "oriental", and neo-Romanesque. Tripoli, where the earliest Italian construction took place, was a center of revivalist styles. Benghazi has a prominent collection of Moorish-revival buildings; Marcello Piacentini, who would later epitomize the Stile Littorio, built a series of lavish Moorish and Indo-Saracenic buildings in Libya from his first Libyan commission in 1912 onwards.

=== Fascist ===
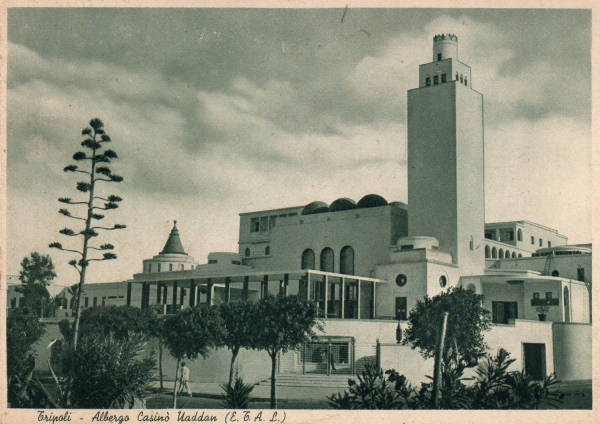
Tripoli's rationalist Albergo Casinò Uaddan (1935)

The arrival of fascist rule markedly shifted colonial policy toward Libya, which was subjected to a "reconquest" in order to root out indigenous resistance (see Second Italo-Senussi War). However, architecture in the colony remained somewhat eclectic. The neo-Moorish Tripoli Cathedral was completed in 1928. Plans for the Cathedral at Benghazi, a more modern but still strictly neoclassical building, were finalized in 1929.

The second decade of fascist rule, from 1932, was marked by more rigid regulation of the urban built landscape. In 1933, Ottavio Cabiati and Alberto Alpago-Novello published a new plan for Tripoli which aimed to secure the complete segregation between Italians and "Libyans" (i.e. the pre-colonial population), who were to be sequestered in the Medina and outlying settlements. The plan had provisions for the prevention of "shame-facedly exotic or pretentious buildings", urging consistency in architecture. On the other hand, the plan's agenda for the Medina was emblematic of policies toward pre-existing local architecture: it should testify to "the existence of the oriental city closer to Europe: a source of enjoyment for artists and an incentive to tourism." Preexisting neo-Moorish constructions, even the cathedral, were "overwhelmed" by a series of glacial five-story edifices, which were also the first major attempts at housing construction in the colonies (prior projects having been almost exclusively public buildings). Florestano di Fausto took a leading role in 30s renovations in Tripoli and Benghazi.

In 1936, Giovanni Pellegrini published his "Manifesto of Colonial Architecture", which articulated a new expression of the Rationalist style for the African setting. Pellegrini endorsed Libyan vernacular architecture as a worthy influence for the "colonial style":

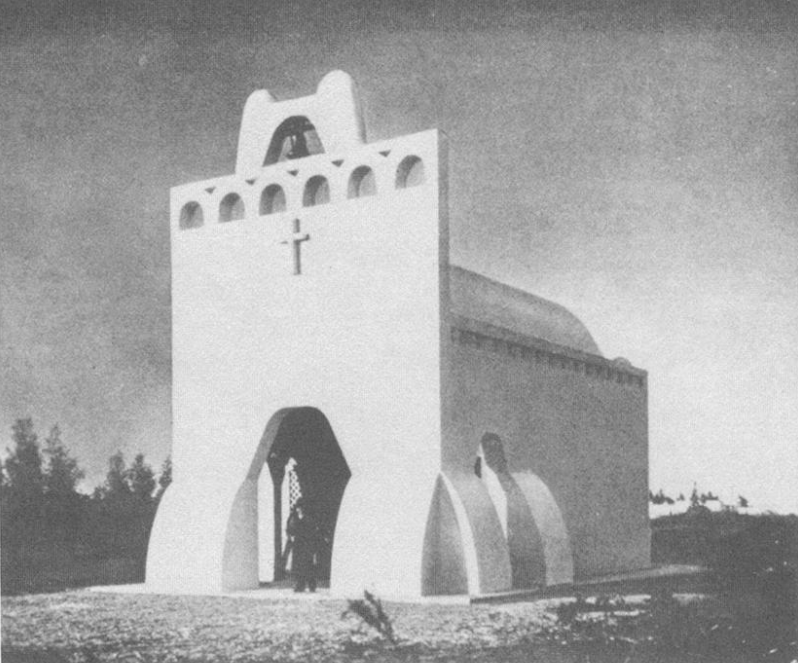
Rava's Church at Suani-ben-Aden (1930) combines Italian Rationalist and Libyan vernacular styles

Let us summarise what from the vernacular architecture must be applied in modern architecture. Practical solutions for protection against climatic factors: a) for the city: streets shaded by porticos and vegetation [...] b) For the home: inner courtyards with loggias, curtains, hanging gardens [...]. The aesthetic values resulting from the use of these are: a) for the city: a plastic configuration, non-metallic cubist effect of masses and polychrome. b) for the house: exaltation of the doorway, hiding of the interior of the house, sense of austerity of family life, terraces with loggias on the façade and above the ceilings as a double roof.

Other similarly-minded architects, such as Carlo Enrico Rava, endorsed the incorporation of Libyan vernacular into colonial architecture based on its having more "Roman" than Arab character. This justified the use of vernacular forms as obedience to the "incentive of 'Latinity'", namely the civilizational destiny of Italian colonialism. While Pellegrini's theoretical alignment with vernacular influence was not a matter of government policy, it did inform his work and that of other architects in Italian Libya and beyond. Specifically, the construction of "new towns" in rural Libya were an "ideal testing ground" for Pellegrini's ideas.

==== Rural settlements ====
Italo Balbo hoped to increase the Italian population of Libya to an eventual 1-2 million. This demographic colonization initiative, with the eventual goal of the full integration of Libya into "metropolitan" Italy, required the settlement of Italians as farmers throughout the Libyan countryside. To this end (emblematic of the fascist glorification of rural life), several unique expressions of Italian colonial architecture were erected. The final "pacification" of rural Libya, completed in 1932, allowed for the massive expropriation and clearing of rural Tripolitania and Cyrenacia for settlement.

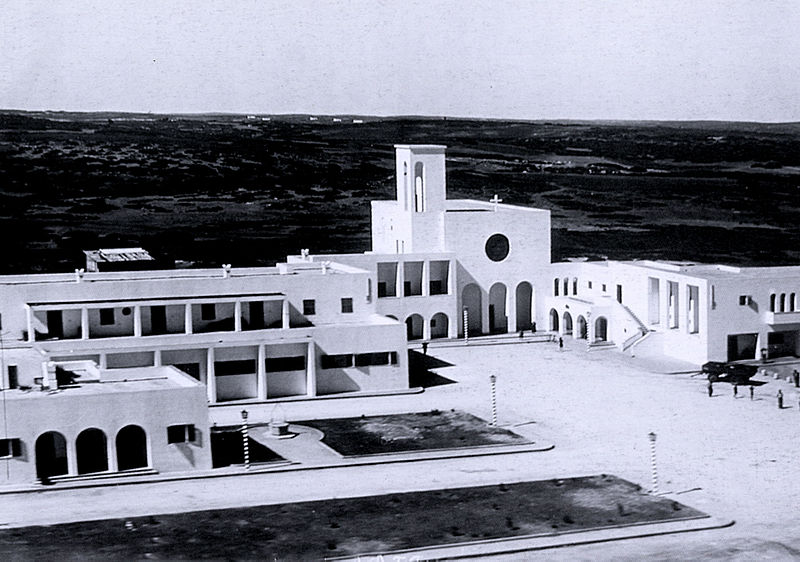
Cesare Battisti Village (now Qirnada), a typical example of Libya's colonial "new towns", in 1934

At the height of the demographic colonization initiative in the mid-30s, every new settlement in Libya was master-planned by an architect. 26 new towns (overwhelmingly for Italian settlement, but some for Arabs) were built, ranging in size from clusters of ~30 houses to settlements for 200 peasant families. Architects ruled out basing new towns off of Italian rural models, as these new towns were supposed to be superior to previous iterations of rural life. Thus, they drew heavily on fascist architectural models and the aforementioned Libyan vernacular syncretism. In general, the new towns were defined by whitewashed, unadorned, and flat-roofed buildings which dominated the surrounding landscape. The church and Casa del Fascio were usually equally major structures on a central square, which was lined by a school, post office, and other public buildings. One-story, three-bedroom pre-furnished peasant houses were distinctly separated from the central square.

The four Libyan villages which were built, intended to force formerly nomadic and pastoralist Bedouins into stable settlements, were similar to the Italian ones, but substituted the Casa del Fascio for an Islamic Society and allowed for a cafe. Other facilities were meant to accommodate for Bedouin ways of life, as understood by the Italian architects. The style of buildings was, like in the Italian villages, angular, whitewashed, and stripped of ornament. The small number of Libyan villages compared to Italian ones despite the far greater number of Libyans in the rural workforce, illustrated the perfunctory attention paid to Libyan subjects of Italian rule.

== Somalia ==
=== Pre-fascist ===
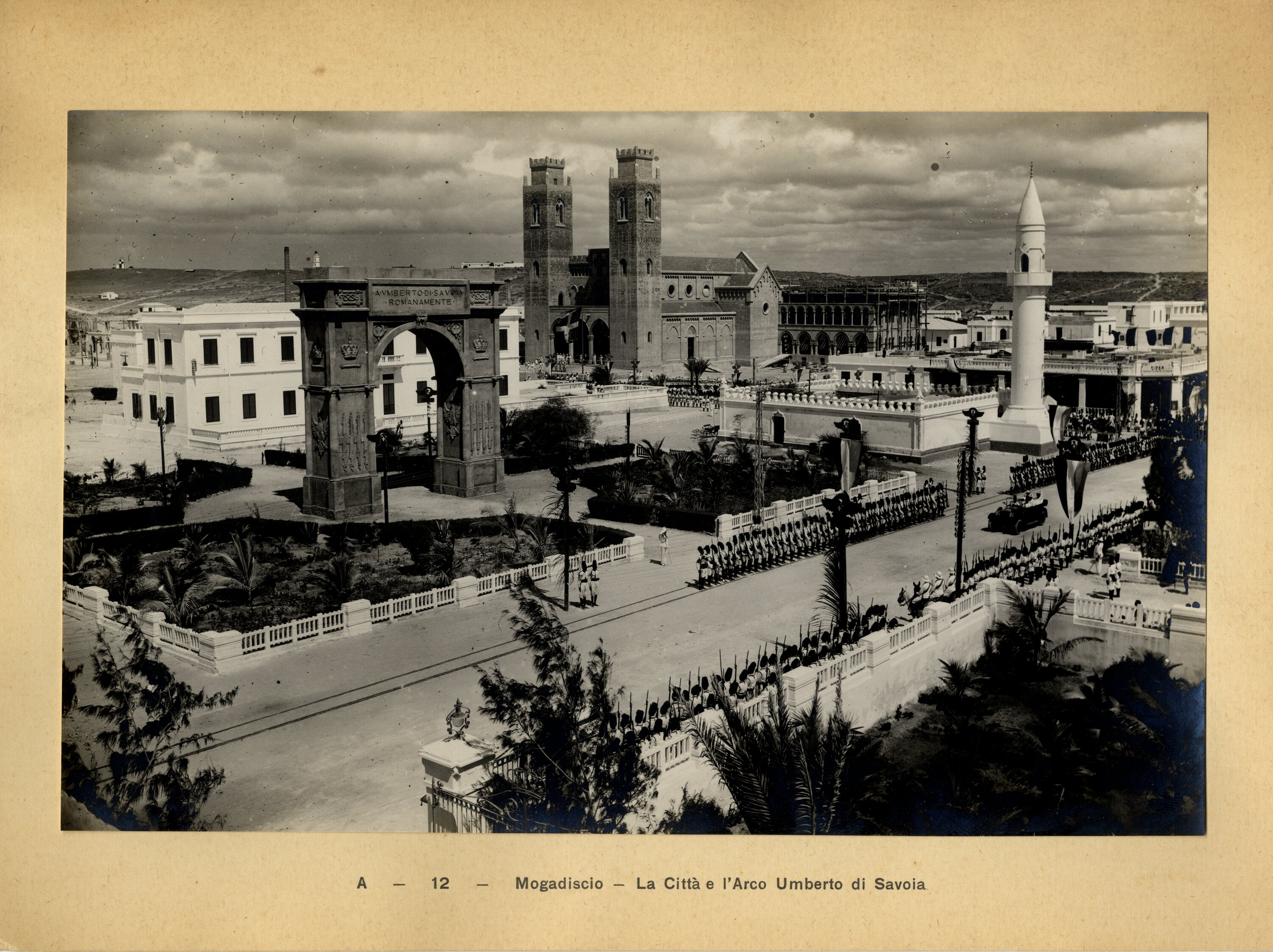
View of central Mogadishu in 1928, with the Arch of Crown Prince Umberto, the now-destroyed Cathedral, and the medieval Arba'a Rukun Mosque

Italy first gained sovereignty over the cities of Benadir in 1896. Initially, the cities were administered by the Filonardi Company until 1905, when the cities came under the Italian state. This shift from indirect to direct administration was formalized in 1908. However, compared to Eritrea, the establishment of Italian urban plans and buildings in Somalia was slow, owing perhaps to its geographic distinctness and relative lack of importance. Developments there were a "distant echo" of projects in Eritrea, and much of the colony remained in the hands of its native inhabitants until 1922. Like in the other colonies, the capital of Mogadishu was the focus of new architecture, and town plans aimed to establish a "completely separate" European district. The first relatively minor attempts at planning came in 1912, when Governor Giacomo de Martino planned a civic center facing the coast and the construction of new "native quarters" in the city outskirts.

=== Fascist ===
Construction picked up after the rise of fascism and the appointment of Cesare Maria De Vecchi as governor, and several major public buildings were erected in eclectic styles along newly planned avenues. The Cathedral of Mogadishu, completed in 1928, was designed in a Norman Gothic style, based on Cefalù Cathedral. The style was intended to recall the Christian (re)conquest of Sicily from its Arab rulers. Other buildings constructed in the 1920s were in a generally neo-Moorish style. Guido Corni was the first to commission a general plan for the city, like other plans based on the separation of Italian and native populations. His plan successfully surrounded the historic core of Mogadishu with an orderly grid, nonetheless, the European town was still interspersed with pre-existing Somali buildings. The Italians selectively applied local vernacular styles to new constructions. In the late 1930s, a series of Rationalist buildings were erected in Mogadishu, most prominently the Casa del Fascio, which later became the Somali Parliament. East African authorities based out of Addis Ababa were dissatisfied with the city's development due to the persistence of native Somali structures, like mosques, within the new European town. However, the outbreak of World War II ended any further attempts at planning. The remnants of Italian Mogadishu were badly damaged by the Somali civil war, although some of its buildings, including the Arch of Crown Prince Umberto, have been restored in the 2010s.

== Dodecanese ==
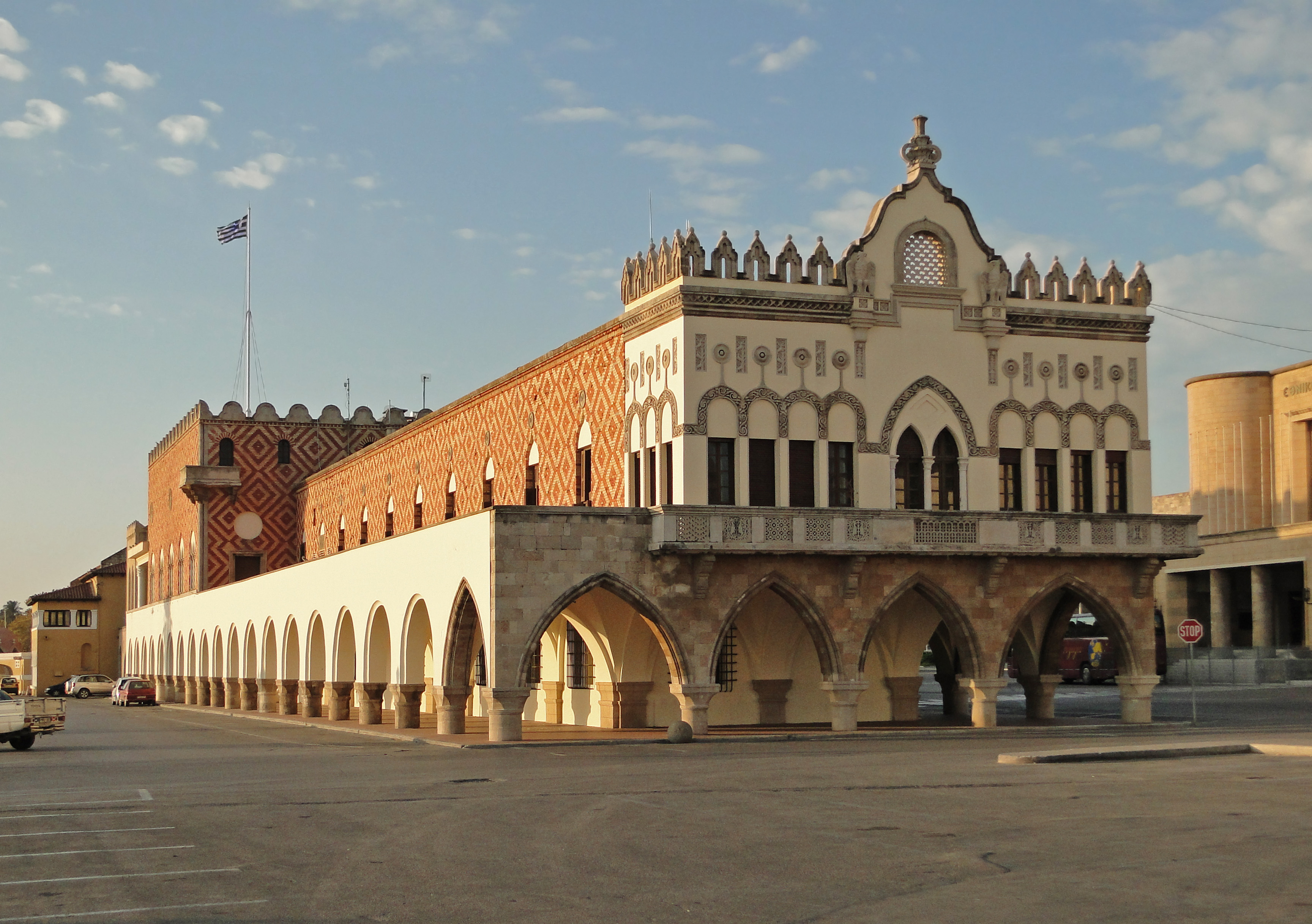
Di Fausto's Venetian revival Governor's Palace (1926) in Rhodes is an example of the use of medieval architecture to assert Italian rule in the Dodecanese

Although Italy enjoyed sovereignty over the Dodecanese Islands from 1912 onward, colonial settlement did not begin until 1923, when the Italian Islands of the Aegean were officially annexed as a colonial possession of Italy. Unlike the African colonies, the Dodecanese were occupied exclusively during the period of fascist governance in Italy, and thus its colonial architecture only reflects this period. However, the historical rule of the Knights of Rhodes in the islands provided colonial architects with rich inspiration for an eclectic, revivalist Italian style in the Aegean. The first major projects undertaken in Rhodes, the center of the colony, aimed to restore the remnants of Hospitaller rule, including the Palace of the Grand Master. Florestano Di Fausto took a leadership role in the reshaping of Rhodes on both historical and modern Italian terms. Regarding Di Fausto's plan of the city, submitted in 1926, urban planner Luigi Piccinato commented that the "new city [...] must not appear out of place" in Rhodes. Construction projects in the city aimed to remove any Ottoman elements and apply medieval Italian and Byzantine-style motifs to new construction. An emblematic example of this first phase of semi-historicist Italian colonial architecture in the Dodecanese is the Palazzo del Governatore (1926), a structure strongly reminiscent of the Doge's Palace in Venice. Di Fausto constructed over fifty buildings across the islands (also constructing major projects on Kos, Kastellorizo, Kalymnos, and Leros) before departing from the islands in 1927, and his work there would define colonial architecture in the colony until the end of Mario Lago's service as governor of the islands.

The assumption of the Governorship by Cesare Maria De Vecchi in 1936 inaugurated a second phase of colonial architecture in the Dodecanese. De Vecchi's government aimed to bring the architectural language of the administration more in line with fascist architecture elsewhere in the empire, going as far as to strip some of Di Fausto's buildings (such as the Grande Albergo delle Rose, now Casino Rhodos) of their decoration. De Vecchi's architectural ideals were epitomized by the new town of Portolago (now Lakki) on Leros, where he hired architects Armando Bernabiti and Rodolfo Petracco to erect a purely rationalist settlement. Above all, this second era of colonial architecture on the Dodecanese was without much of the historicist ethos promoted by Governor Lago and aimed to promote fascist Italy and its Roman imperial predecessor. Other prominent rationalist buildings erected during De Vecchi's term include the Puccini Theatre and Rhodes Aquarium, both by Bernabiti.

== Ethiopia ==
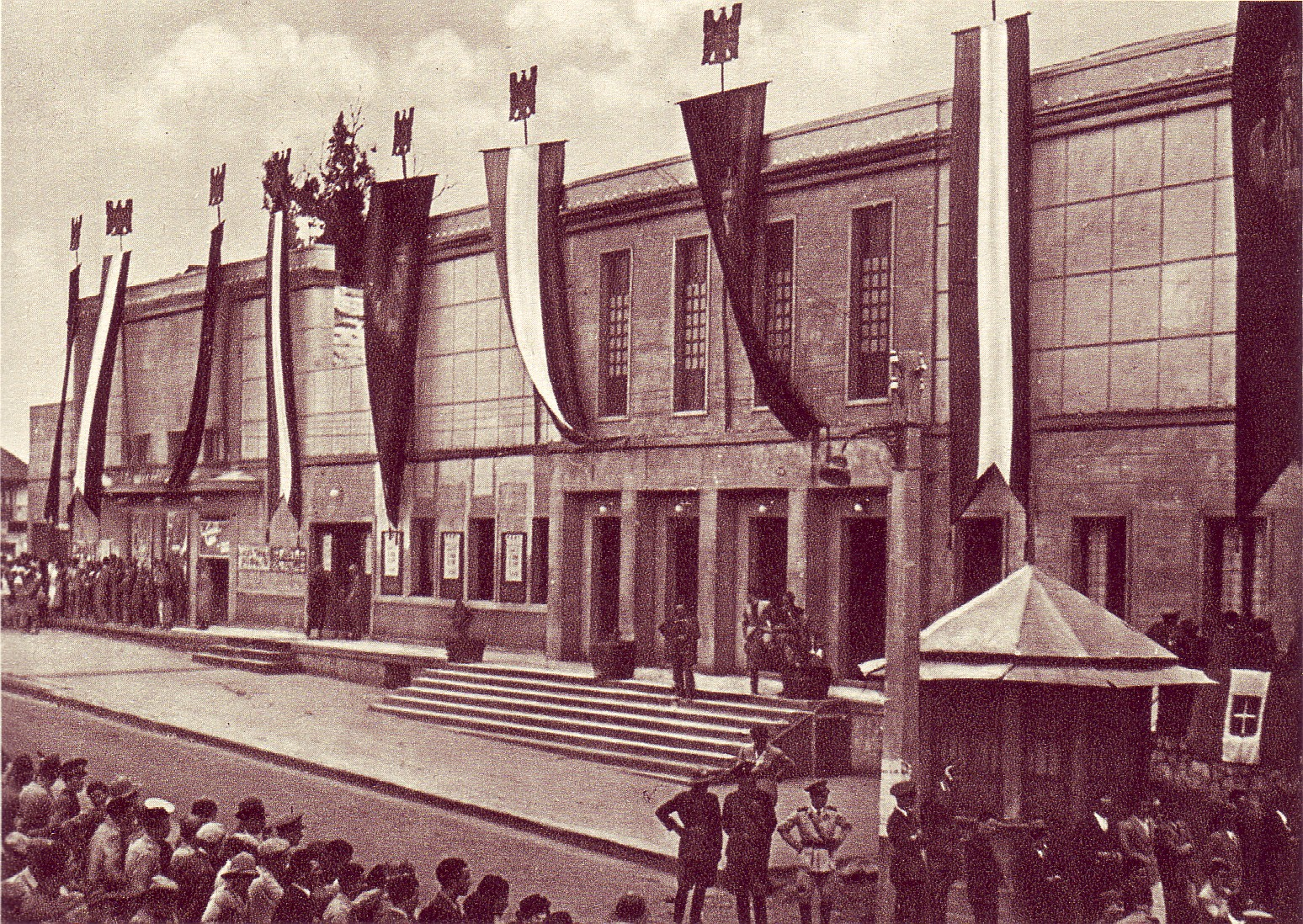
The inauguration of the "Supercinema Italia" in Addis Ababa (1937)

Italy's conquest of Ethiopia in 1936 marked the birth of Italian East Africa, i.e. Ethiopia, Somaliland, and Eritrea. Architectural and planning initiatives focused on the capital of Addis Ababa, which was made the capital of the entire colony of Italian East Africa. The Italians, regarding Addis as primitive and squalid, immediately attempted to reshape the city by establishing a new urban plan which separated the African population from the projected European garden city core. Le Corbusier even submitted a plan for the new Addis, which was not chosen. Instead, Ignazio Guidi and Cesare Valle developed a typical colonial plan which separated the city into racially segregated and strictly zoned nodes connected by boulevards (adjacent to the existing historic center). The plan took nearly four years to develop, and construction began in 1939, only to end a few months later with the British conquest of Italian East Africa. Nonetheless, the plans made for Addis, Gondar, Jimma, and Dessye represented the most comprehensive and explicit attempts at planning ever undertaken in the colonies.

A handful of public buildings and a few hundred housing units were constructed in Addis during the Italian colonial adventure in Ethiopia, although tens of thousands of Italians settled in expropriated Ethiopian properties before the demise of Italian East Africa.

The Italians also drafted plans for a number of other towns in Ethiopia, including Haramaya, and Asella. In Harar, Guido Ferrazza designed a number of buildings to be erected, including a Casa del Fascio and Mosque, although these apparently were not built.

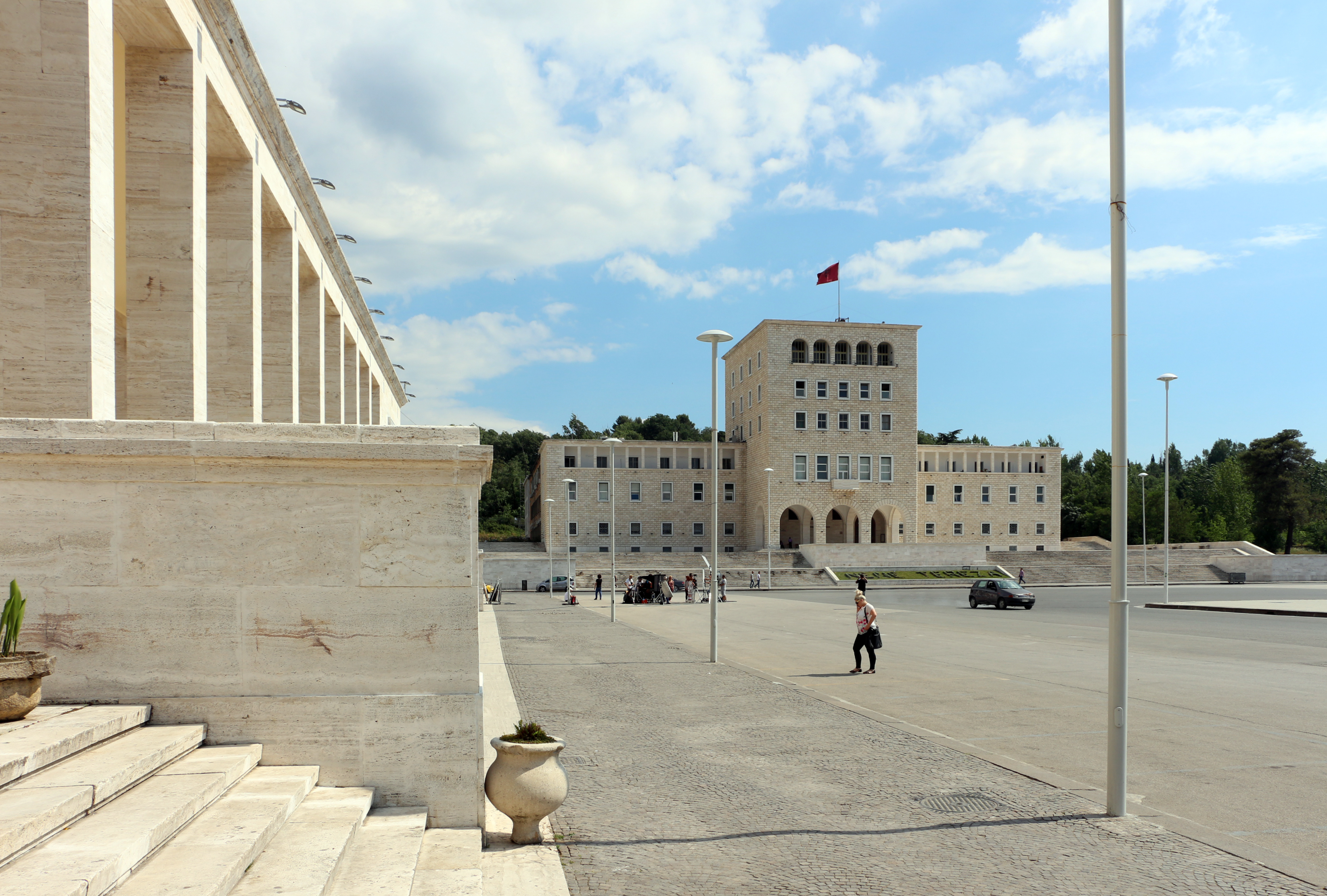
Dëshmorët e Kombit Boulevard terminates at the former Casa del Fascio (1942), now the Aula Magna of the University of Tirana, in Mother Theresa square.

== Albania ==
Albania was Italy's shortest-lived colonial undertaking, lasting from 1939 until Mussolini's fall in 1943. Prior to the occupation, through the 1930s, Italian architects had great influence on Tirana's urban landscape, erecting a series of prominent public buildings, including the National Bank of Albania on Skanderbeg Square. During occupation, fascist planners extended Tirana's central axis to the new Piazza Littorio, where a series of buildings, including a Casa del Fascio, were erected. This addition turned the axis, renamed Viale dell’Impero and now Dëshmorët e Kombit Boulevard, into a massive fasces. The street was lined with monumental fascist structures.

Most of these survive into the present day, and are well-regarded by the Albanian public and government.

== See also ==
- Florestano Di Fausto
- Alberto Alpago-Novello
- Guido Ferrazza
- Ottavio Cabiati
- Carlo Enrico Rava
