= Giovanni Pellegrini =

Italian architect (1908–1995)

- Born: 28 September 1908; Milan, Kingdom of Italy
- Died: 11 May 1995 (aged 86); Como, Lombardy, Italy
- Education: Polytechnic University of Milan
- Occupation: Architect

Giovanni Pellegrini (28 September 1908 – 11 May 1995) was an Italian architect, known for his contributions to colonial architecture during the Fascist era and for postwar urban development in Milan.

He graduated in architecture from the Polytechnic University of Milan in 1931 and began his career at the firm of Alberto Alpago-Novello, Ottavio Cabiati, and Guido Ferrazza. In 1933, he was sent to Libya, where he emerged as a prominent figure in Italian Rationalist architecture, designing numerous buildings and planned settlements in Italian Tripolitania. After World War II, he focused on public housing and urban planning projects in Milan.

== Life and career ==
Pellegrini graduated in architecture under Cesare Chiodi at the Polytechnic University in 1931, registering with the Milan Order of Architects in 1932.

He began his career in the studio of Alberto Alpago-Novello, Ottavio Cabiati, and Guido Ferrazza, who sent him to Libya in early 1933 to assist with the master plan of Tripoli and oversee construction of the Benghazi Cathedral. He soon opened his own practice in Tripoli, focusing on private architecture and urban planning across Tripolitania.

Among his key works from the 1930s are several villas and residential buildings, often in collaboration with engineers and architects such as Vittorio Agujari, Francesco Bono, and Roberto Moiraghi. During the demographic colonization campaigns of 1938–1939, he also designed rural settlements, including the villages of Baracca, Corradini, Marconi, Crispi, and Tazzoli, often in collaboration with Umberto Di Segni.

Pellegrini contributed to the theoretical discourse on colonial architecture with three influential essays—"L'architettura romana nell'Africa settentrionale", "Notizie sullo sviluppo urbanistico della Tripolitania", and "Manifesto dell'architettura coloniale"—all published in Rassegna di Architettura in 1936.

In 1939, he participated with Carlo Enrico Rava in the competition for the Verbania master plan. He returned to Italy in 1943 after the British occupation of Tripoli. From 1945 onward, he worked on public housing for INA and urban redevelopment projects in Milan. One of his final works, a residence in Via Carlo Porta, received heavy criticism. He died in Como on 11 May 1995.

== Bibliography ==
- Consoli, Gian Paolo (1993). "Giovanni Pellegrini". In Giuliano Gresleri; Pier Giorgio Massaretti; Stefano Zagnoni (eds.). Architettura italiana d'oltremare (1870-1940). Venice: Marsilio.
- D'Amia, Giovanni (2015). "PELLEGRINI, Giovanni". Dizionario Biografico degli Italiani (in Italian). Vol. 82: Pazzi–Pia. Rome: Istituto dell'Enciclopedia Italiana. ISBN 978-88-12-00032-6.
- D'Amia, Giovanna (2011). "L'urbanistica coloniale di Giovanni Pellegrini e la pianificazione di villaggi libici". Territorio (57): 125–134. doi:10.3280/TR2011-057016.
- Fariello, Francesco (1935). "Edifici a Tripoli. Architetto Giovanni Pellegrini". Architettura (XIV): 150–155.
- Godoli, Ezio; Giacomelli, Milva (2005). Architetti e ingegneri italiani dal Levante al Magreb (1848-1945). Florence: Maschietto Editore. pp. 269–273.
- Santoianni, Vittorio. Il Razionalismo nelle colonie italiane 1928-1943. La «nuova architettura» delle Terre d'Oltremare (PDF). Naples: Università di Napoli. pp. 181–193.
- Sartoris, Alberto (1941). Gli elementi dell'architettura funzionale. Milan: Hoepli. pp. 623–626.
