= Governor's Palace, Benghazi =

Governor's Palace
- Palazzo del Governatore
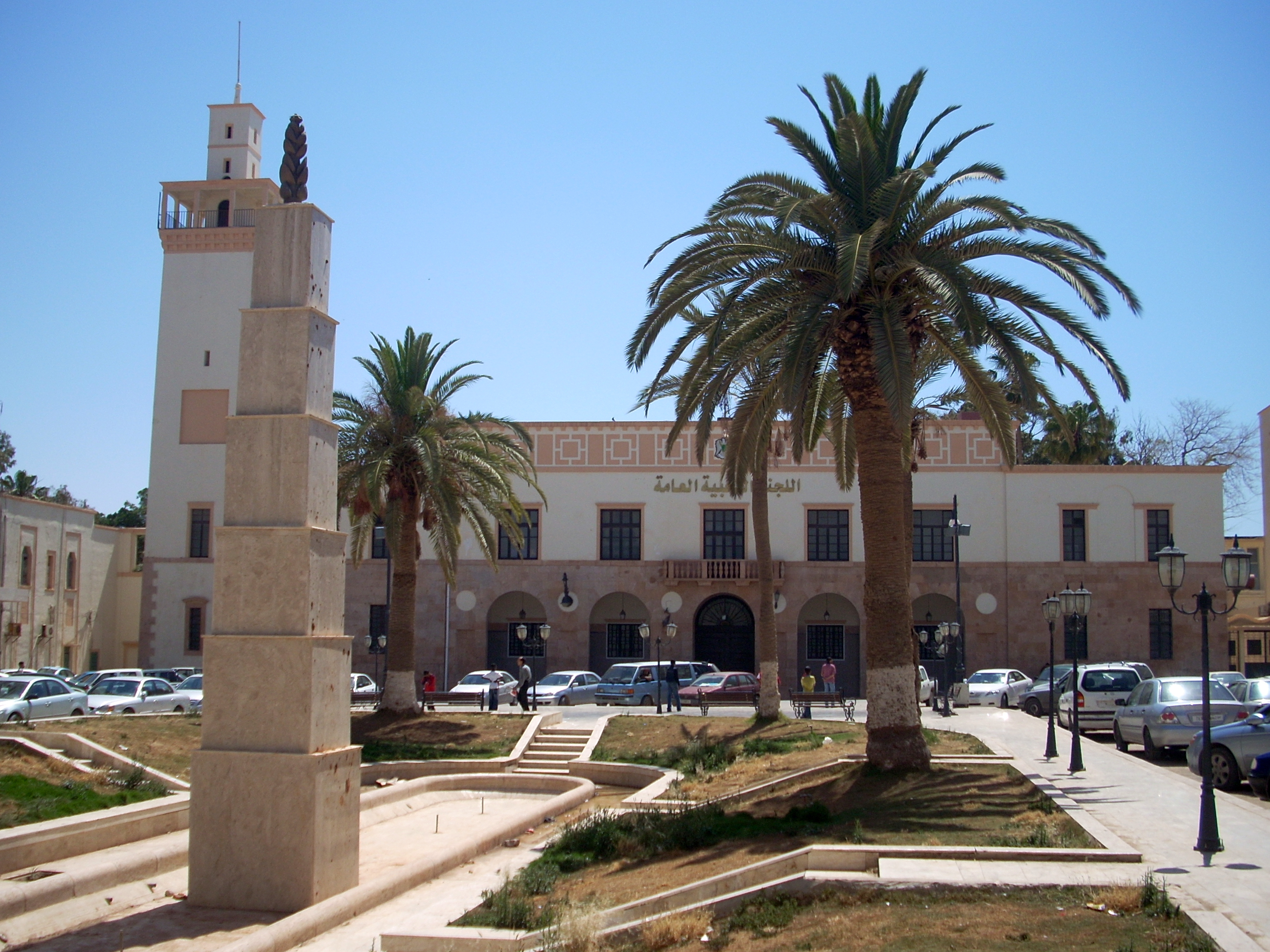
- The building in 2009
- Click on the map for a fullscreen view

General information
- Location: Benghazi, Libya
- Coordinates: 32°07′00.55″N 20°03′28.62″E

Design and construction
- Architects: Alberto Alpago-Novello, Ottavio Cabiati, Guido Ferrazza

The Governor's Palace (Italian: Palazzo del Governatore) is a historic building located in Benghazi, Libya.

== History ==
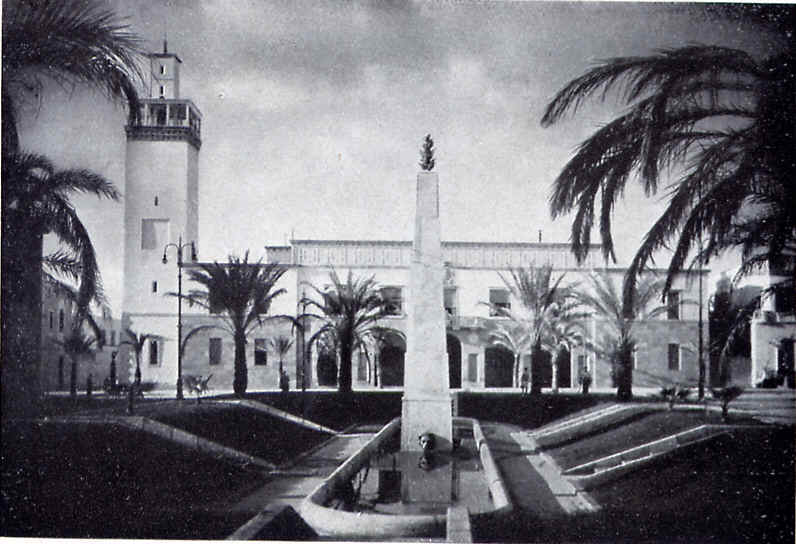
The building in the 1930s

The building, designed by architects Alberto Alpago-Novello, Ottavio Cabiati and Guido Ferrazza, was constructed between 1928 and 1934, as part of the urban development programme promoted by the Italian colonial authorities.

Following the end of colonial administration, the building became a residence of the Senussi royal family. On 24 December 1951, the palace was the place from which King Idris of Libya proclaimed Libya's independence. It subsequently became the headquarters of the University of Libya.

The building, along with much of Benghazi's city centre, was damaged during the Libyan Civil War. In November 2022, it was announced that restoration on the palace works had started.

== Description ==
Located in the centre of Benghazi, the building is a significant example of Italian colonial architecture in Libya. It features an eclectic style that combines elements of Islamic and Moorish architectural traditions with compositional and decorative features derived from Italian architecture.
