= Umberto Di Segni =

Italian architect, engineer, and urban planner (1894–1958)

- Born: 6 October 1894; Tripoli, Ottoman Tripolitania
- Died: 22 March 1958 (aged 63); Netanya, Israel
- Occupations: Architect, engineer, urban planner

Umberto Di Segni (6 October 1894 – 22 March 1958) was an Italian architect, engineer, and urban planner, known for his contributions to colonial architecture during the Fascist era.

== Life and career ==
Umberto Di Segni was born in Tripoli on 6 October 1894, into a bourgeois Italian Jewish family originally from Livorno. At the age of sixteen, he moved to Rome to study at the Academy of Fine Arts, where he attended courses alongside Alessandro Limongelli. After World War I, he returned to Rome, where he earned a degree in civil engineering.

Di Segni was one of the leading architects involved in colonial architecture in Tripolitania and Cyrenaica. In 1923, he designed the new Dar Bishi Synagogue. In 1933, he exhibited a project for public housing for Jews in Tripoli at the 5th Milan Triennial; the following year, he participated in the Tripoli International Fair, presenting his work at the Italian Colonial Engineering Pavilion.

Among his notable works are the Gazzelle Hotel in Zliten—commissioned by Italo Balbo—and several buildings for the judicial administration in Tripoli, including a reeducation center, courtroom, and sanatorium. He also designed courthouses and prisons in Misrata and Gharyan, as well as private residences and public housing in Tripoli.

Di Segni was responsible for numerous planned rural settlements, including the villages of Beda Littoria and Berta in the province of Derna; Bianchi (1936), Oliveti (1938), Giordani Ovest (1939), Micca (1939), Tarhuna (1939), and Tazzoli (1939) in the province of Tripoli; and, in collaboration with Giovanni Pellegrini, Breviglieri (1936), Gioda (1938), and Crispi (1938) in the province of Misrata.

After his home was hit during the Allied bombing of Tripoli on 21 April 1941, Di Segni took refuge in the countryside with his family. When the British entered the city in January 1943, he resumed his architectural work, designing the Cinema Odeon and overseeing the restoration of the Alhambra Theatre. During this period, he also assisted war refugees and coordinated the departure of Libyan Jews emigrating to Israel.

He left Libya in 1948, moving to Israel with his son the next year, later joined by his wife and daughters. Settled in Netanya, he worked for the city's technical office. Suffering from Parkinson's disease, Di Segni died on 22 March 1958 at the age of 63.

== Sources ==
- Arbib, Jack (2010). L'ombra e la luce. Note su Umberto Di Segni, architetto. Milan: Il Laboratorio.
- Godoli, Ezio; Giacomelli, Milva (2005). Architetti e ingegneri italiani dal Levante al Magreb (1848-1945). Florence: Maschietto Editore. pp. 269–273.
- Giuliano Gresleri; Pier Giorgio Masseretti; Stefano Zagnoni, eds. (1993). Architettura italiana d'oltremare 1870-1940. Venice: Marsilio.
- Maggio, Francesco; Reginella, Natalia. "The graphics and visions in Oltremare by Umberto Di Segni". In Carlo Battini; Enrica Bistagnino (eds.). Dialogues: Visions and Visuality (PDF). Milan: FrancoAngeli. pp. 786–795.
- Santoianni, Vittorio (2008). Il Razionalismo nelle colonie italiane 1928-1943. La «nuova architettura» delle Terre d'Oltremare (PDF). Naples: Università di Napoli.
