= Brick Store Museum =

Museum in Kennebunk, Maine, US

Coordinates: 43.387510°N 70.537505°W

Brick Store Museum, Kennebunk, Maine
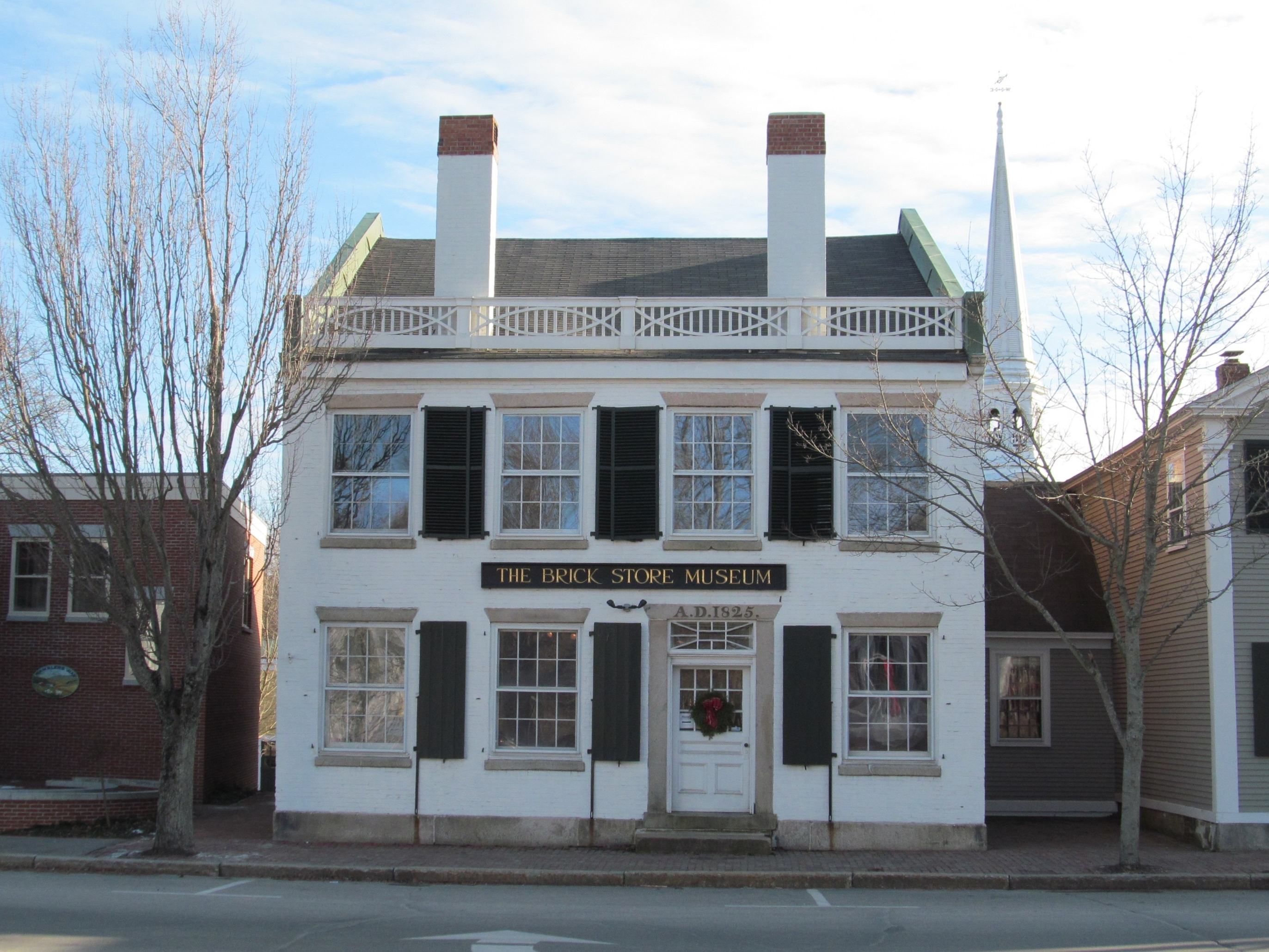
- Brick Store Museum
- Established: 1936
- Location: 117 Main Street, Kennebunk, Maine 04043
- Founder: Edith Cleaves Barry
- Website: www.brickstoremuseum.org

The Brick Store Museum, located at 117 Main Street in the town of Kennebunk, Maine, is one of only a few museums that opened during the Great Depression in the United States. It focuses on preserving the heritage of the Kennebunks through its collections, preservation, interpretation, and exhibition of its material culture. As a history and art center in Southern Maine, the museum's collections include objects ranging from 19th-century paintings to shipbuilding tools, from 18th-century clothing to contemporary art. It is located in the heart of the Kennebunk Historic District, occupying 18,000 square feet of space in several buildings on Main Street.

The Brick Store Museum's buildings comprise the oldest commercial block in Kennebunk, with structures dating from 1810 to 1860. Prior to becoming part of the museum, these buildings housed the town's first library, a telegraph office, a furniture store, a grocery store, Water District offices, an auto supply store, apartments, a general store, and a fraternal lodge.

== History ==
In 1825, wealthy merchant and shipowner William Lord (1799-1873) constructed a general store out of bricks. There were few such structures in Kennebunk, therefore it was nicknamed "Lord’s Brick Store." The nine-foot windlass used for conveying goods between floors can still be seen through the museum's second-floor ceiling. In 1936, William Lord's great-granddaughter, Edith Cleaves Barry (1884–1969), inherited the Brick Store building and established the Brick Store Museum in the space. It remains to be one of a few American museums opened between the Great Depression and World War II. Immediately to the right of the Brick Store is a building constructed in 1810 by Enoch Hardy, a local tobacconist. He maintained his own shop on the second floor, and the first floor was used as a grocery store. Kennebunk's post office and telegraph office were once in this building as well. The Kennebunk Free Library Association also used the space as a library. The next building on the block was built at the corner of Water and Main Streets by Samuel Clark in 1860. It was later moved to its current location, to the right of the Hardy building, in 1870. It operated as a butcher shop and restaurant until 1906, when it became an auto supply store.

The corner structure, currently painted a salmon color, was built in 1814 by Moses Savary. It was originally painted white, and because most buildings in Kennebunk were then yellow, this building became known as "the white store." The building was used almost continuously as a market until becoming part of the museum. Its last occupant was an antique shop. The three buildings on the block were purchased by Barry as they became available, the last in 1958; eventually, all four structures were connected on the interiors to form one cohesive block.

The fifth building in the museum complex was given by the Barry family, originally as the New Art Center Workshop, run by Edith Barry. The house at 4 Dane Street (located behind the museum), was built in the 19th century and inherited by Edith Barry through her mother's family. It is currently used by the museum as a programming space and collections storage facility, as well as rental office space.

== Collections ==
The museum's collections represent various aspects of the region's history from its earliest settlements to the present day. The majority of the 35,000-piece object collections speaks to socio-cultural, economic, and geo-political themes from the early 19th to the 21st centuries, with a few standout examples from the late 17th and mid 18th centuries.

The decorative and fine arts collections include examples by some of northern New England's finest artists (e.g. Thomas Badger, John Brewster, Jr., Abbott Fuller Graves, William Hackett, Louis D. Norton, and Hannah Brown Skeele). Regionally significant textiles, clothing, household goods, and maritime artifacts are distinguishing features of the permanent collections. Additional highlights are the collections pertaining to renowned Maine-based authors Sarah Orne Jewett, Kenneth Roberts, and Booth Tarkington.

The museum's archival collection totals approximately 25,000 pieces. Letters, ledgers, corporate records, photographs, glass plate negatives, postcards, charts, architectural plans, maps, and genealogical material are made available to researchers and are used in exhibitions.

== Programs and exhibitions ==
An array of programs offered by the museum reaches out to all ages in the New England community. Craft workshops, lecture series, member-only events, and children's summer and February vacation camps continuously appear on the museum's yearly event schedule. Special events such as the museum's 75th Anniversary celebration in 2011, the annual "All Souls Walk and Dinner" celebrating Halloween, and a year-end Holiday Tea at a chosen historic home in Kennebunk are produced by the staff and volunteers of the museum.

The museum's online presence consists of two Twitter feeds, following the travels of founder Edith Barry, a yearly digital photography contest, and multiple online exhibits featured on the museum web site.

== Renovation ==
The museum underwent comprehensive structural renovations to its four, 19th-century Main Street buildings in 2008–2009, as the result of a capital campaign. The museum remained open to the public throughout, but sections were temporarily offline as construction progressed. All collections stored in the complex were packed and moved within the facility. The renovations were completed in the summer of 2009.
