= Edith Barry =

American painter (1884–1969)

- Self portrait
- Born: 1884; Boston, Massachusetts
- Died: 1969 (aged 84–85)
- Known for: Painting

Edith Cleaves Barry (1884–1969) was an American sculptor, painter, illustrator and designer born in Boston Massachusetts. She studied at the Art Students League in New York City and with Frank DuMond and Richard E. Miller. Barry was the founder and served as the director of the Brick Store Museum in Kennebunk, Maine from 1936 to 1945.

In 1939, during the Great Depression, Barry was employed by the US Treasury Department's Section of Painting and Sculpture to paint a post office mural, The Arrival of the First Letter – Kennebunk Post Office from Falmouth – June 14, 1775 in her home town of Kennebunk, Maine.

== Early life ==
Edith Barry was born to Charles Dummer Barry and Ida Morton (Thompson) Barry on March 10, 1884, in Boston, Massachusetts. Her father, Charles, was an import/export agent with Henry W. Peabody & Co., first in Boston, and later New York City. She grew up in Montclair, New Jersey. Both of her parents had ties to Kennebunk, Maine, and owned a family home on Summer Street in Kennebunk's Historic District.

Edith attended preparatory school at Miss Wheeler's School (now The Wheeler School) in Providence, Rhode Island, graduating in 1904.

Beginning in 1906, Edith would travel to Europe annually to practice her art in places like Giverny, France; Rome, Italy; Austria; Spain; and London. She trained with Frederick Frieseke and Frederick Macmonnies, both American artists living in France. Her journals about her European travels and art training are included in the archives of the Brick Store Museum.
