= Lord Mansion =

Historic house in Maine, United States

- U.S. National Register of Historic Places
- U.S. Historic district – Contributing property
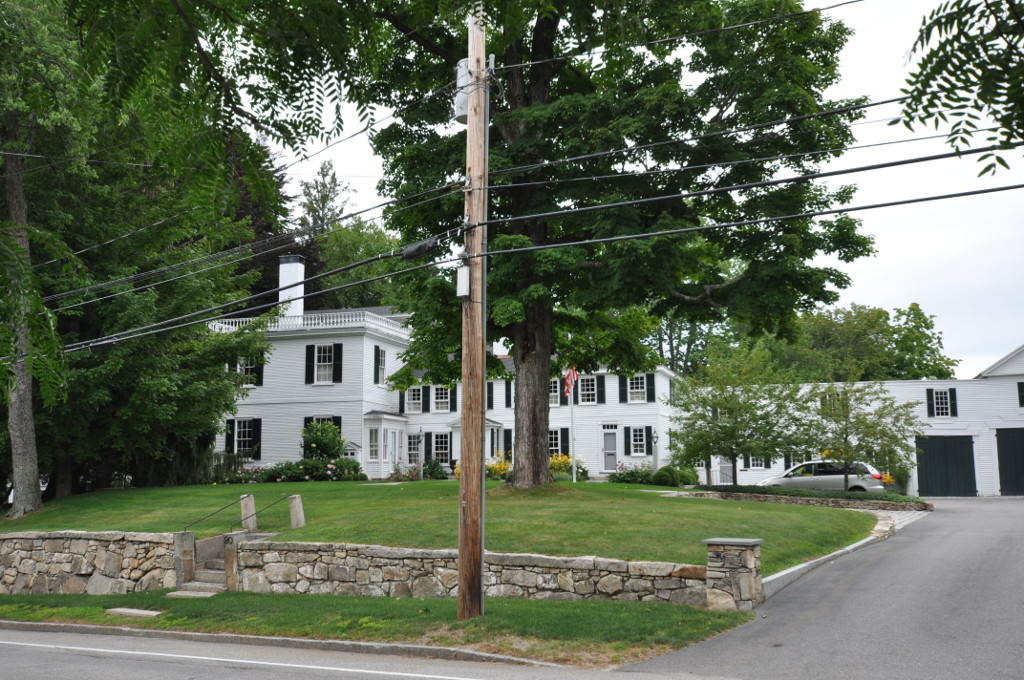

- Location within Maine Location within the United States
- Location: 20 Summer St., Kennebunk, Maine
- Coordinates: 43°23′15″N 70°32′5″W
- Area: 1 acre (0.40 ha)
- Built: 1760
- Built by: Johnathan Banks
- Architectural style: Colonial, Federal
- Part of: Kennebunk Historic District (ID74000324)
- NRHP reference No.: 73000158

Significant dates
- Added to NRHP: April 2, 1973
- Designated CP: June 5, 1974

The Lord Mansion is a historic house at 20 Summer Street (Maine State Route 35) in Kennebunk, Maine. The multi-part house includes a 1760 Georgian house as an ell to its main element, an 1801 Federal period structure. The house was listed on the National Register of Historic Places in 1973 for its architectural significance; it is also a contributing element to the Kennebunk Historic District.

== Description and history ==
The Lord Mansion is located on the north side of Summer Street, opposite its junction with Park Street. The house consists of multiple sections, roughly oriented from west to east, set back from the road on landscaped grounds above a retaining wall. The main house is a roughly square two-story wood-frame structure, with a hip roof, and flushboard on the main (west-facing) facade and clapboards elsewhere. The front facade is adorned with pilasters at the corners and on both sides of the entrance, where they rise all the way to the roof line. The entrance is framed by sidelight windows, with a fanlight window above. A three-part window is on the second level above the entrance, and there is a gabled dormer-like section on the roofline, which has a decorative carved fan. The roof is encircled by a low balustrade. Attached to the rear (east) of this block is a 2 1/2-story five-bay hip-roof block that is the oldest part of the house.

The first portion of the house was built by Jacob Curtis (1701-1776), who owned the land prior to 1763. Jacob Curtis sold the house to Job Lyman, August 9, 1763. Lyman sold the property, with buildings to Ebenezer Rice, October 27, 1765. It was while Rice owned the property that he rented the small house to Jonathan Banks, from York, Maine. However, Banks never owned the property as deeds prove. Nor did he build the building on the land as recent new research show. Rice sold to Jacob Curtis (1727-1786). Curtis died intestate and his estate sold the property with two acres and buildings to local judge Jonas Clark, who in 1801 built what is now the main portion of the house. The house was purchased in 1822 by William Lord, a Kennebunk merchant and shipbuilder. The house is locally distinctive for its combination of well-preserved Federal period elements. The rear ell has been extensively altered.

== See also ==
- National Register of Historic Places listings in York County, Maine
