= Thomas Badger =

American artist

Thomas Badger (1792–1868) was an American artist in Boston, Massachusetts, in the 19th century. He specialized in portraits. He trained with John Ritto Penniman. Portrait subjects included: John Abbot; William Allen, of Bowdoin College; Asa Clapp; Julia Margaretta Dearborn; George B. Doane; Henry Wadsworth Longfellow; Benjamin Page; Thomas Paul, of Boston's African Meeting House; Jotham Sewall; Benjamin Vaughan; Charles Vaughan; Frances Western Apthorp Vaughan; George Wadsworth Wells; Jonathan Winship. Around 1849 a still life by Badger in the collection of the Boston Museum was considered "a highly finished and excellent picture, something in the style of Van Huysom. There is a truth and reality in the articles represented, seldom seen in this class of pictures."

He married Rebecca Melendy (1795–1852); children included George Washington (died at age 16 in 1853). He was also related to the portrait artist Joseph Badger. He died of "lung fever" in Cambridge in 1868. Works by Badger are in the collections of the Boston Athenaeum; Maine Historical Society; Colby College; the Brick Store Museum and Fine Arts Museums of San Francisco.

== Images ==
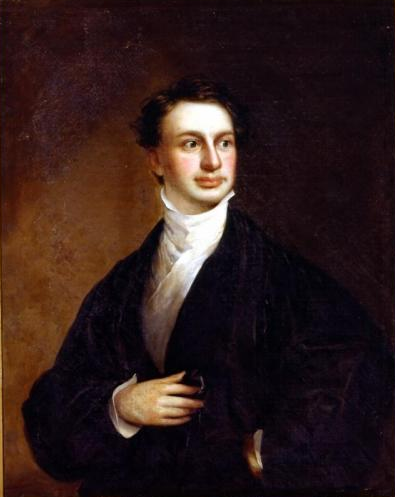
Portrait of H.W. Longfellow by T. Badger, c. 1829

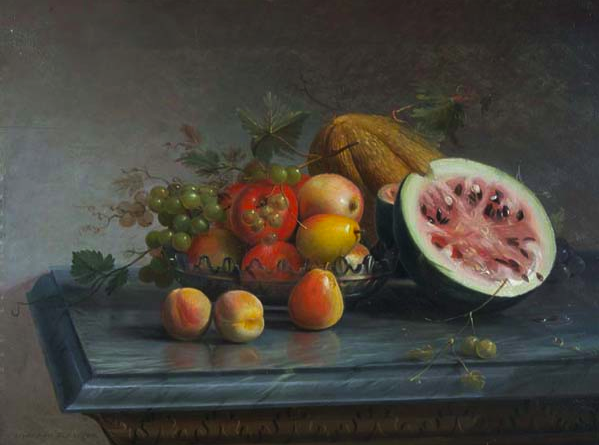
Still life, by T. Badger, 19th century

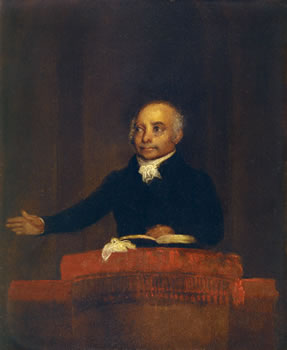
Portrait of Thomas Paul by T. Badger, c. 1825
