= Benghazi Cathedral =

Former Roman Catholic church in Benghazi, Libya

Coordinates: 32°6′50″N 20°3′34″E

- Cathedral of the Holy Name of Jesus
- كاتدرائية بنغازي; Cattedrale di Bengasi
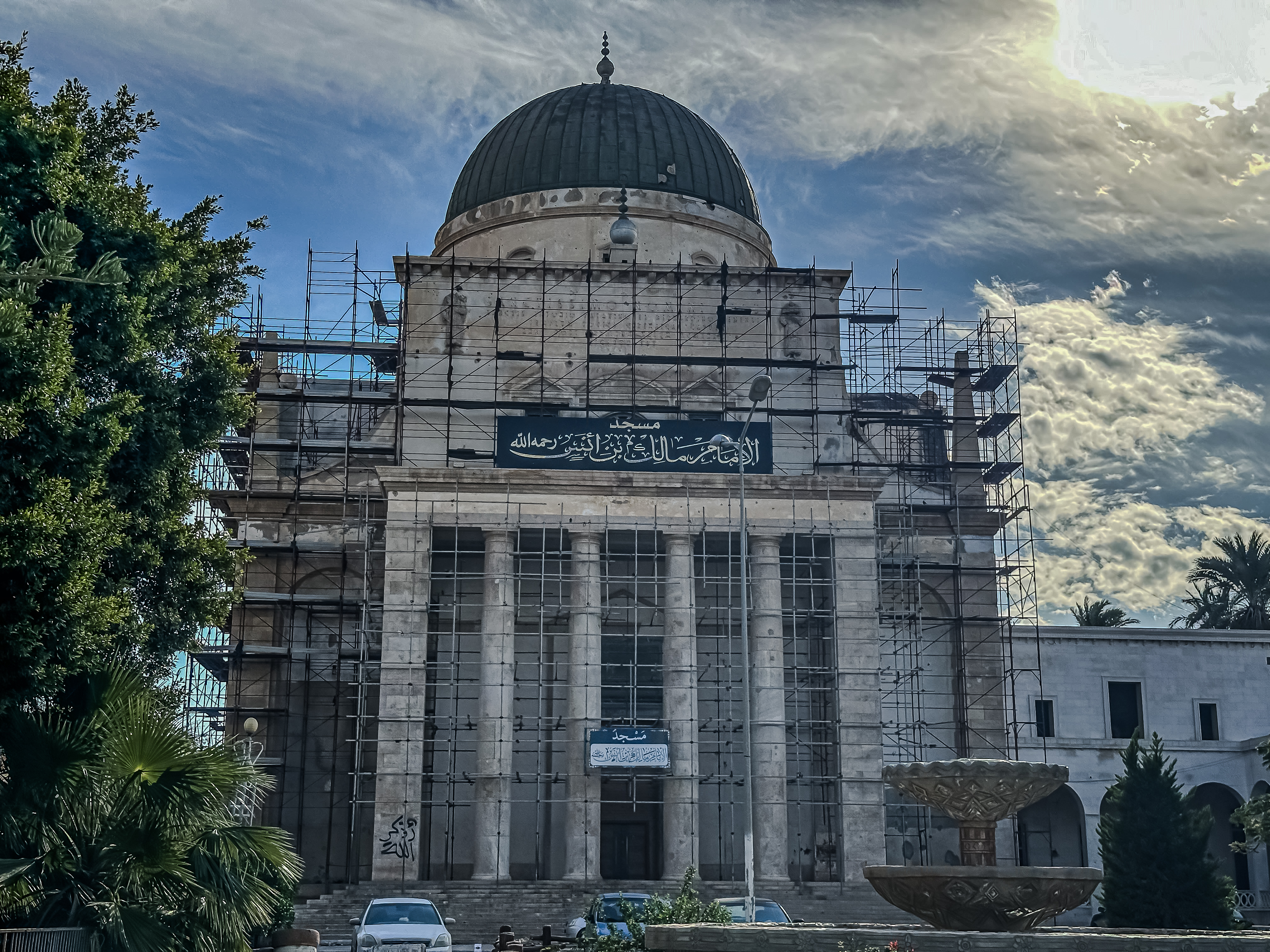
- The cathedral's façade in 2025, with signage labeling the building as a mosque
- Benghazi Cathedral
- Country: Libya

History
- Status: Cathedral (inactive)
- Dedication: Holy Name of Jesus; Anthony of Padua; Bernardino of Siena

Architecture
- Architects: Guido Ferrazza; Alberto Alpago-Novello; Ottavio Cabiati
- Style: Neoclassical
- Years built: 1929–1936
- Closed: 1970

Administration
- Diocese: Apostolic Vicariate of Benghazi

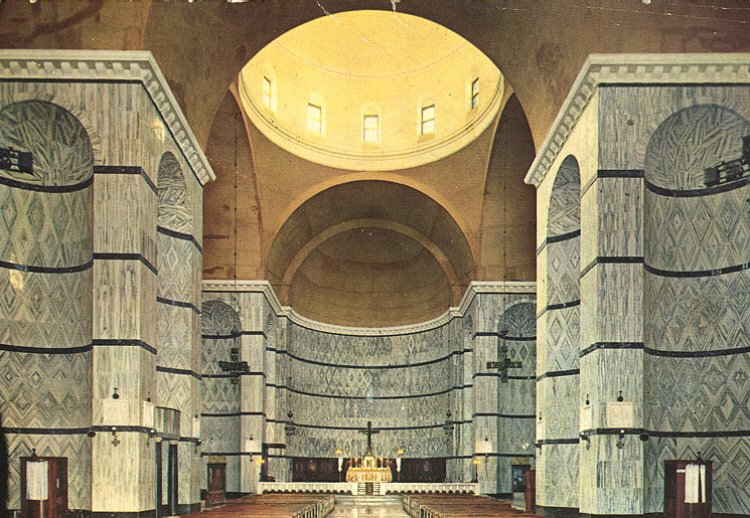
The interior before 1941

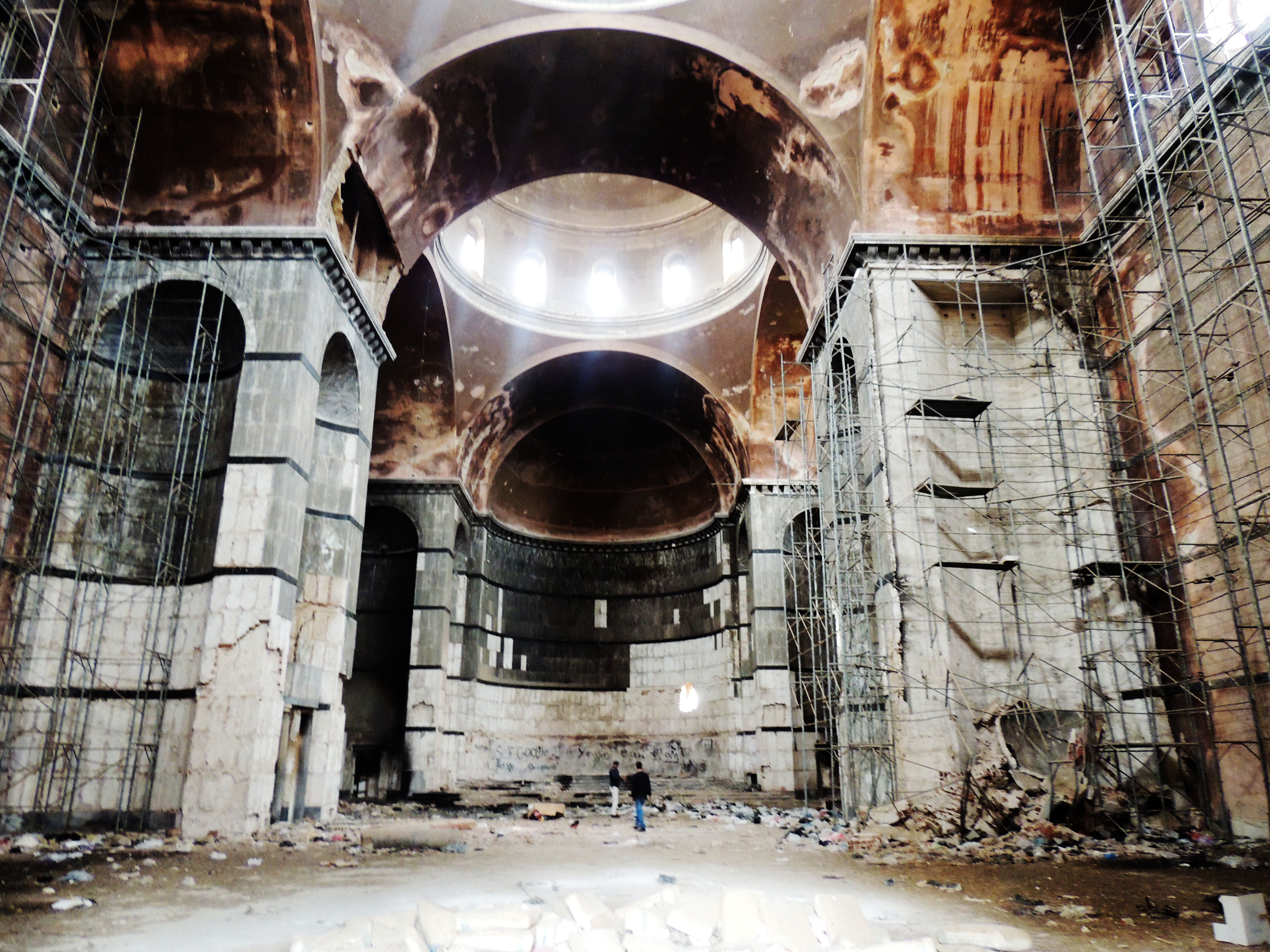
...and in 2020

Benghazi Cathedral (Arabic: كاتدرائية بنغازي, Italian: Cattedrale di Bengasi) is a disused former Roman Catholic cathedral in the city of Benghazi, Libya. It is the see of the Apostolic Vicariate of Benghazi.

== History ==
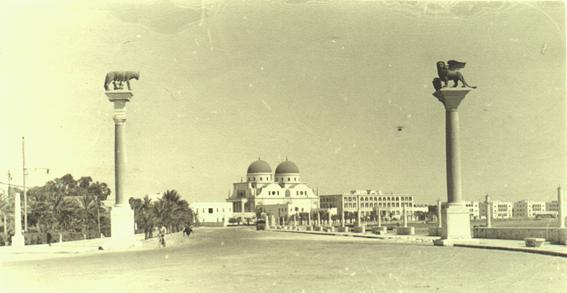
The cathedral seen from the Viale della Vittoria, 1941

In 1926, the Governor of Tripolitania commissioned the construction of a cathedral for Benghazi from an engineer, Danusso. The land where the cathedral was to be built, at the heart of Italian Benghazi, was previously occupied by Arab shopkeepers, who were evicted for the construction. The cathedral was planned at the end of a piazza, adjacent to the Governor's Palace and Hotel Roma. It is arguably the most prominent Italian construction in the city, and was a centerpiece of the Italian-designed master plan for the city, which was finalized in 1929.

Danusso designed the load-bearing structure, but the architects Ottavio Cabiati, Alberto Alpago-Novello, and Guido Ferrazza were brought into the project to design the building. Construction began in 1929, and work on the interior began in 1934. The cathedral opened for services in 1935, but was not consecrated until 1939. The cathedral was dedicated to the Holy Name of Jesus, with secondary dedications of the to Anthony of Padua and Bernardino of Siena. Upon its construction, it was the largest church structure in Italy's colonial empire and among the largest in North Africa.

The cathedral was visited by Benito Mussolini during his March 1937 visit to Libya. It was damaged when Benghazi was captured by the Wehrmacht during Operation Sonnenblume, with many of the interior fixtures being looted and the floor and doors badly damaged. In the years after King Idris took power in 1951, the Franciscans resident there made efforts to replace losses incurred during the war, but the building slowly slipped into disuse as Benghazi's Catholic population declined. After Muammar Gaddafi took power and suppressed the Libyan Church, plans were made to convert the building into a Mosque, as with the Cathedral of Tripoli, but the cathedral's position prevented worshipers from facing Mecca, and the plans were scrapped. Nevertheless, the cathedral's cross-shaped finials were replaced by crescents. The building was used as a headquarters for the Arab Socialist Union from 1971 to 1976, when a fire caused the building to be abandoned. It would remain abandoned for the next decades. The neglect of the building was taken by some locals to be emblematic of Gaddafi's antipathy toward Benghazi and eastern Libya writ large.

A restoration of the cathedral began under the supervision of Italian architects in 2008, but these were interrupted by the outbreak of the Libyan Civil War. The cathedral survived the Battle of Benghazi (2014–2017) without major structural damage, although it suffered several RPG hits and cosmetic damage to the interior and facade. In 2022, restoration works on the cathedral began again. While municipal authorities stated that restoration works were being done in connection with the cathedral's status as a historic site, signage on the scaffolding of the cathedral indicated that the cathedral was, in fact, being converted into a mosque dedicated to Imam Malik ibn Anas. Locals alleged that the conversion was being done by the city's Awqaf Authority. After uproar, the municipal government and Libyan heritage agency stringently denied that conversion was occurring, stating that the hanging of the sign was unsanctioned by the government, and possibly perpetrated by local Salafists. The early 2020s have seen major rebuilding work in Benghazi, including the demolition of a significant section of Benghazi's Italian quarter by the Libyan National Army. As of 2025, signs labeling the cathedral a mosque remain on its facade.

== Architecture ==
The cathedral's architects, members of the "Milanese Club of Town Planners", had a keen interest in the cutting-edge rationalist aspects of contemporary Italian architecture, and undertook more stylistically ambitious projects in Libya which aimed to integrate local Arab and Italian traditions into modern, cubist structures. However, the cathedral at Benghazi exemplifies the most conservative of Pellegrini, Cabiati, and Alpago-Novello's sensibilities, perhaps as it was their first major commission outside of Italy.

Excepting the cathedral's prominent copper-clad domes, which may take inspiration from Byzantine or local Arab styles, the building's architectural language hinges on a strict fascist classicism, built around Danusso's reinforced concrete load-bearing structure. The cathedral has a basilica form, with a single massive nave terminating in a semicircular apse. The reinforced concrete structure's exterior is covered in white plaster, accented with a massive stone portico supported by four Doric columns and other Palladian forms, including obelisks placed on each corner. The decorative stone elements are of travertine, while the interior's walls and floors were clad with Italian marble arranged in geometric, polychromatic forms. Light is let in through four large oculi and windows along the drums of the domes.The domes and ceilings are covered in a very fine-grained plaster. Original plans included a large freestanding campanile to the west of the cathedral, which was never built. The building is connected to a bishop's palace and monastery (the Apostoloic Vicariate was tended to by Franciscans), forming a small cloister-like courtyard to the west.

The cathedral's interior was relatively austere, even immediately following completion. Architectural drawings of the interior included extensive frescoing and a ciborium in the apse, but these never came to fruition. Prominent decorative elements which were constructed included a stations of the cross and lunettes by Pietro Carnerini, which were removed from the cathedral after 1941 and today are housed in a Traversetolo parish church, and a set of four cross-shaped light fixtures.

Over the decades of neglect since its abandonment, the building has been subject to wide-ranging damage. Rainwater and saltwater have infiltrated the building through broken windows. Much of the reachable marble cladding has been stripped, and the remaining marble has been blackened with soot from fires and explosions. As of 2024, scaffolding and rubble covers the floor. The exterior has been damaged by bullets and explosives, and elements including the two bas-reliefs of the saints and dedication above the portico have been severely damaged. Some of the copper cladding has been stripped away or fallen off of the domes.

== See also ==
- Catholic Church in Libya
