= Battah =

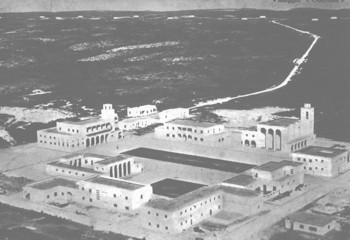

- Location in Libya
- Coordinates: 32°39′28″N 21°6′33″E
- Country: Libya
- Region: Cyrenaica
- District: Al Marj

Population (2006)
  - Total: 6,754
- Time zone: UTC+2 (EET)

Battah or Batta (Arabic: بطّة) is a village in eastern Libya, almost 34 km (21 mi) northeast of Al Marj. During the Italian occupation it was named Oberdan, after the Italian nationalist Guglielmo Oberdan.
