= Hannah Brown Skeele =

American painter (1829–1901)

- Born: May 1, 1829; Kennebunkport, Maine, U.S.
- Died: August 8, 1901 (aged 72); Portland, Maine, U.S.

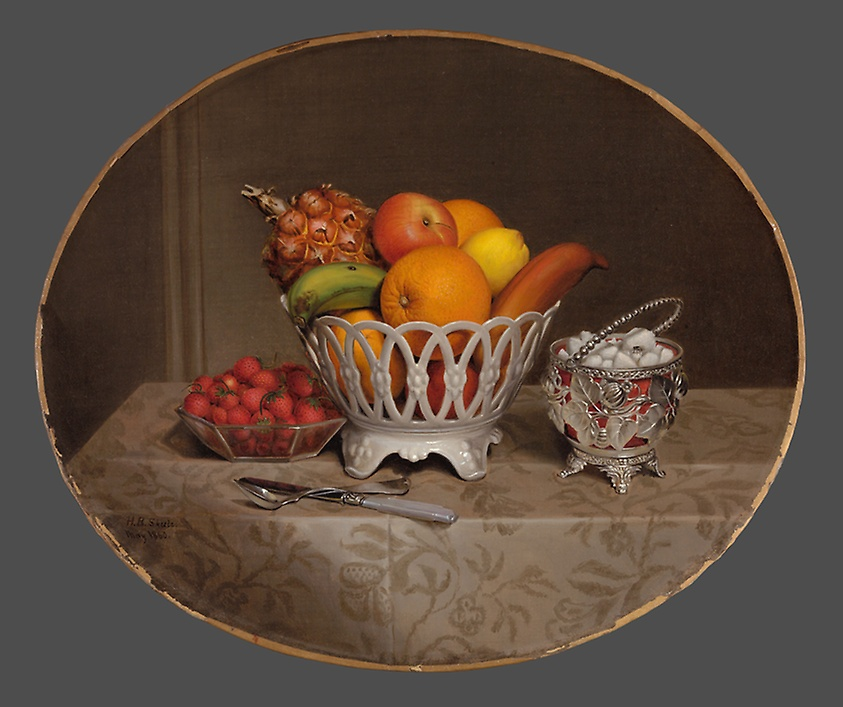
Fruit Piece

Hannah Brown Skeele (1829–1901) was an American painter, best known for her still-lifes, although she also produced portraits and pictures of animals.

== Biography ==
Skeele was born in Kennebunkport, Maine. She was apparently self-taught and may have lived in New York for a few years before moving to St. Louis, where she lived and worked from 1858 to 1871. During those years, she was probably exposed to the still lifes of John F. Francis, who exhibited there, and Sarah Miriam Peale, who was a resident.

Her first exhibition was with the St. Louis Agricultural and Mechanical Association, shortly after her arrival. Most of her paintings include elaborately carved bowls and vases with fruits and flowers in fine botanical detail.

After returning to Maine, she found it necessary to support herself through portrait commissions from clergy, lawyers, university presidents and politicians such as Governor Israel Washburn Jr. This left her unable to create many more still lifes. She rarely signed her paintings, which has made attribution difficult. She died in Portland, Maine, in 1901.
