= Colonial architecture =

Architectural style in former imperial colonies

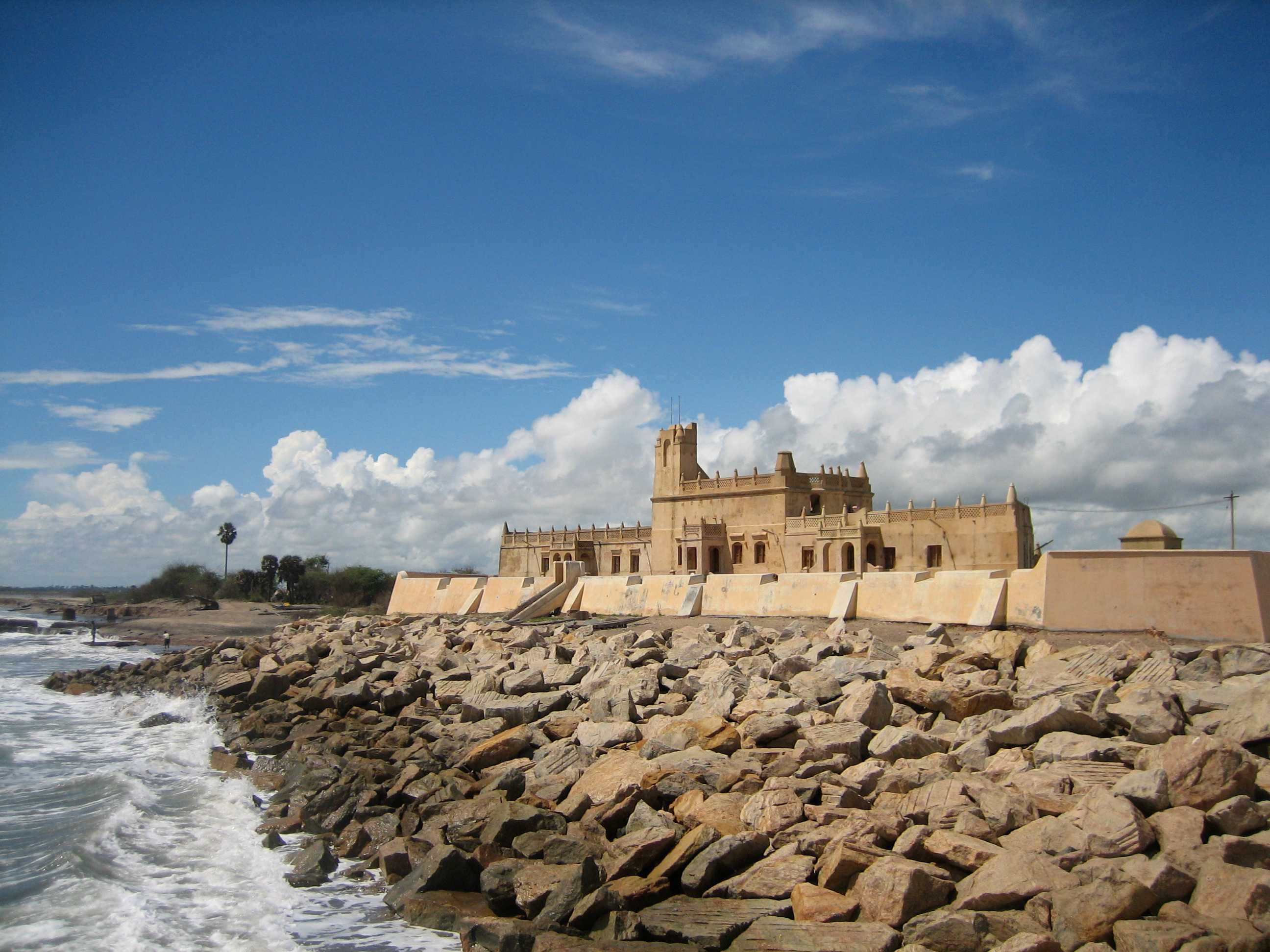
Danish Fort Dansborg at Tranquebar, built by Ove Gedde in 1620.

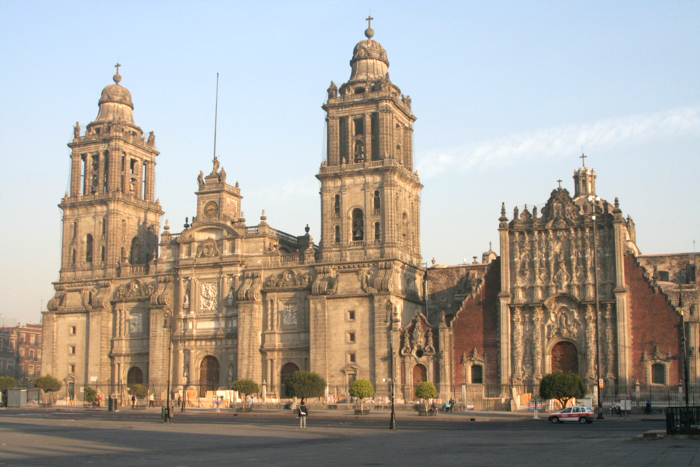
Under construction for more than two centuries, the Mexico City Metropolitan Cathedral is a mixture of three styles that predominated during the colonial era: Renaissance, Baroque and Neoclassic.

Colonial architecture is a hybrid architectural style that arose as colonists combined architectural styles from their country of origin with design characteristics of the settled country. Colonists frequently built houses and buildings in a style that was familiar to them but with local characteristics more suited to their new climate. Below are links to specific articles about colonial architecture, specifically the modern colonies:

== Spanish colonial architecture ==
Spanish colonial architecture is still found in the former colonies of the Spanish Empire in the Americas and in the Philippines. In Mexico, it is found in the Historic center of Mexico City, Puebla, Zacatecas, Querétaro, Guanajuato, and Morelia. Antigua Guatemala in Guatemala is also known for its well-preserved Spanish colonial style architecture. Other cities known for Spanish colonial heritage are Ciudad Colonial of Santo Domingo, the ports of Cartagena, Colombia, and Old San Juan in Puerto Rico.

North America

- Viceroyalty of New Spain
  - Spanish colonial architecture in Mexico
    - New Spanish Baroque
  - Spanish colonial architecture in the United States
  - Spanish Colonial Revival architecture

Caribbean

- Spanish West Indies
  - Spanish colonial architecture in Cuba
  - Spanish colonial architecture in the Dominican Republic
  - Spanish colonial architecture in Puerto Rico

South America

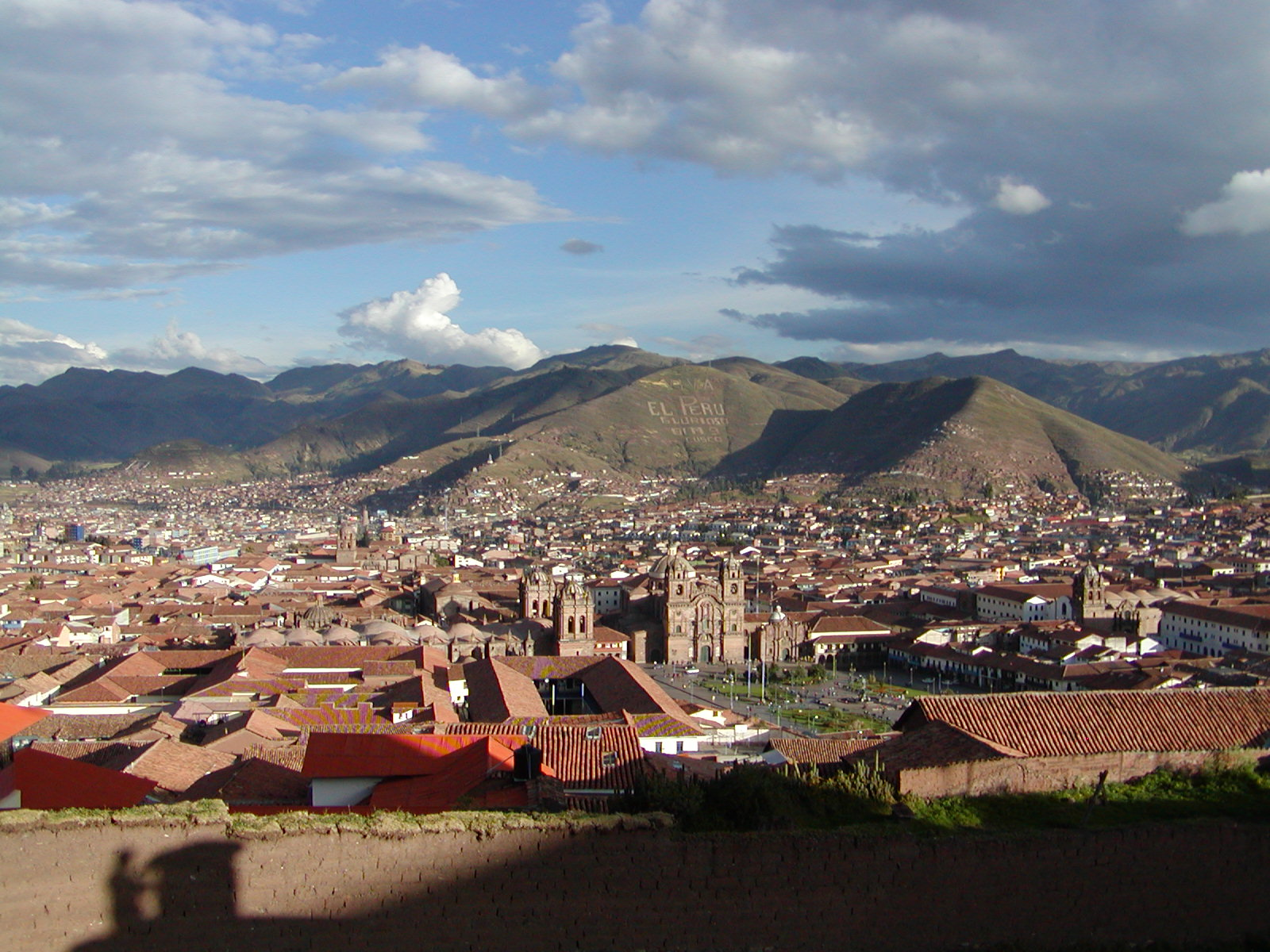
Spanish colonial cities were usually laid out according to La Traza, a strict quadratic plan where the town radiated out from a central plaza (here the Plaza de Armas in Cusco)

- Viceroyalty of Peru, Viceroyalty of New Granada, and Viceroyalty of the Río de la Plata
  - Spanish colonial architecture in Argentina
  - Spanish colonial architecture in Chile
  - Spanish colonial architecture in Colombia
  - Spanish colonial architecture in Peru
  - Spanish colonial architecture in Venezuela
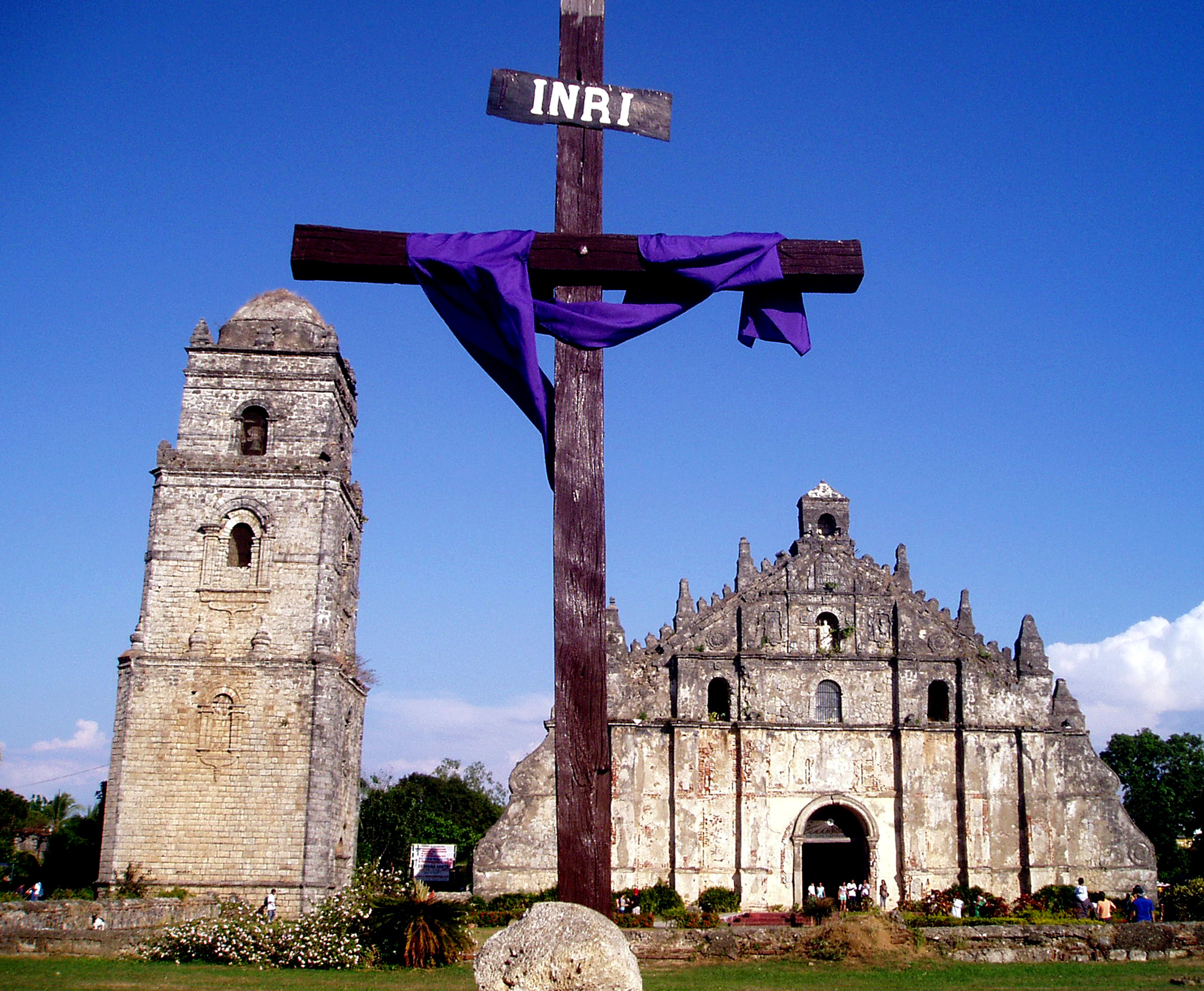
    Paoay Church Ilocos Sur Philippines is a fine example of Spanish Earthquake Baroque only found in the Philippines
- Spanish missions in South America
  - Spanish missions in Bolivia
  - Spanish missions in Brazil
  - Spanish missions in Paraguay

Asia

- Spanish East Indies
  - Spanish colonial architecture in the Philippines
  - Earthquake Baroque
  - Bahay na Bato

== Portuguese colonial architecture ==
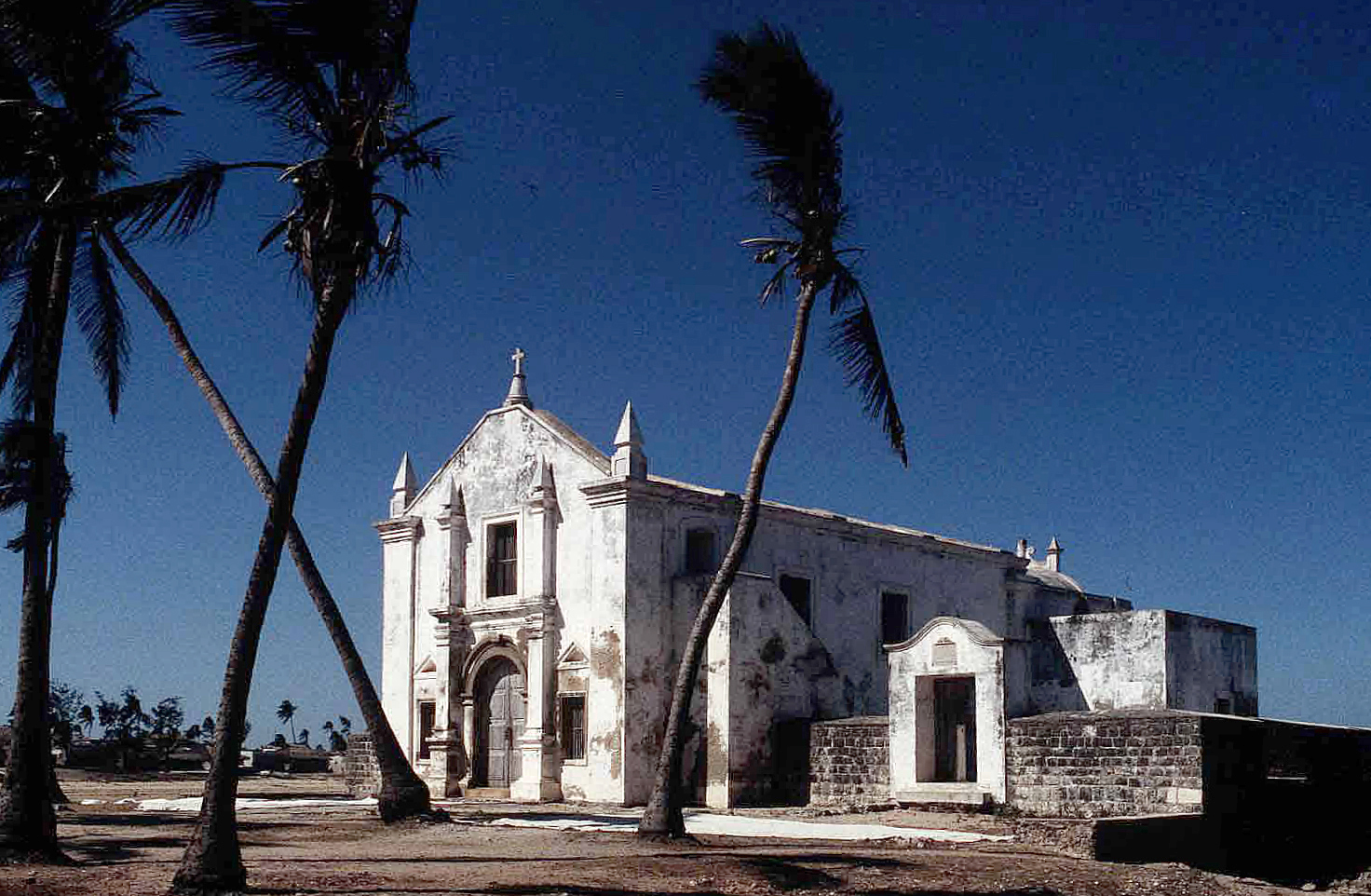
Church of Santo António; b. 1498, Mozambique

Portuguese colonial architecture is most visible in Brazil, Madeira, North Africa and Sub-Saharan Africa, Macau, the Malaysian city of Malacca, city of Goa in India, and Moluccas and Java in Indonesia.

- Asia
  - Portuguese colonial architecture in India
  - Portuguese colonial architecture in Sri Lanka
  - Sino-Portuguese architecture
  - Centro Histórico de Macau
- South America
  - Portuguese colonial architecture in Brazil

== British colonial architecture ==
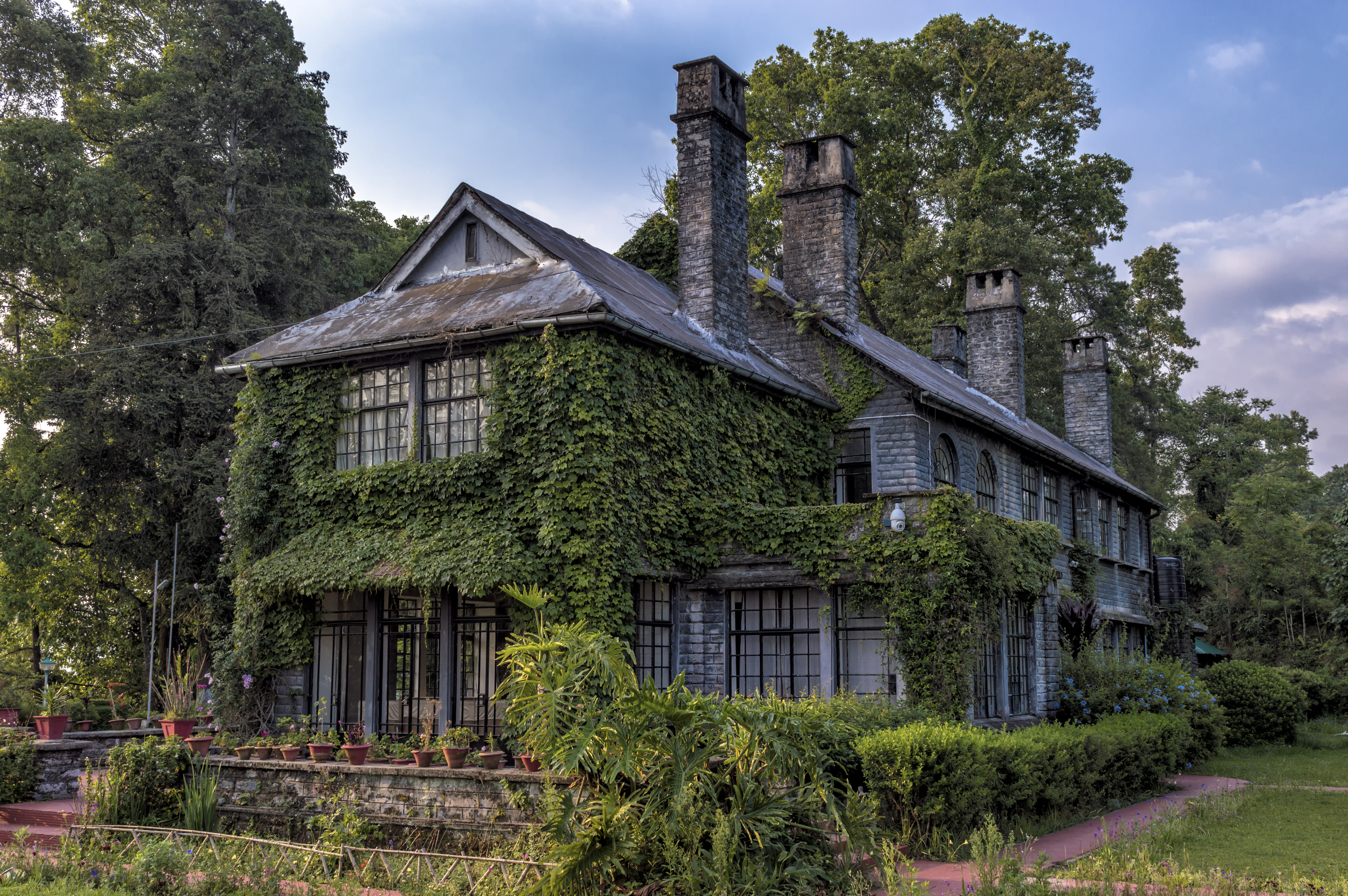
Morgan House is a classic example of colonial Victorian era architecture in Kalimpong, India.

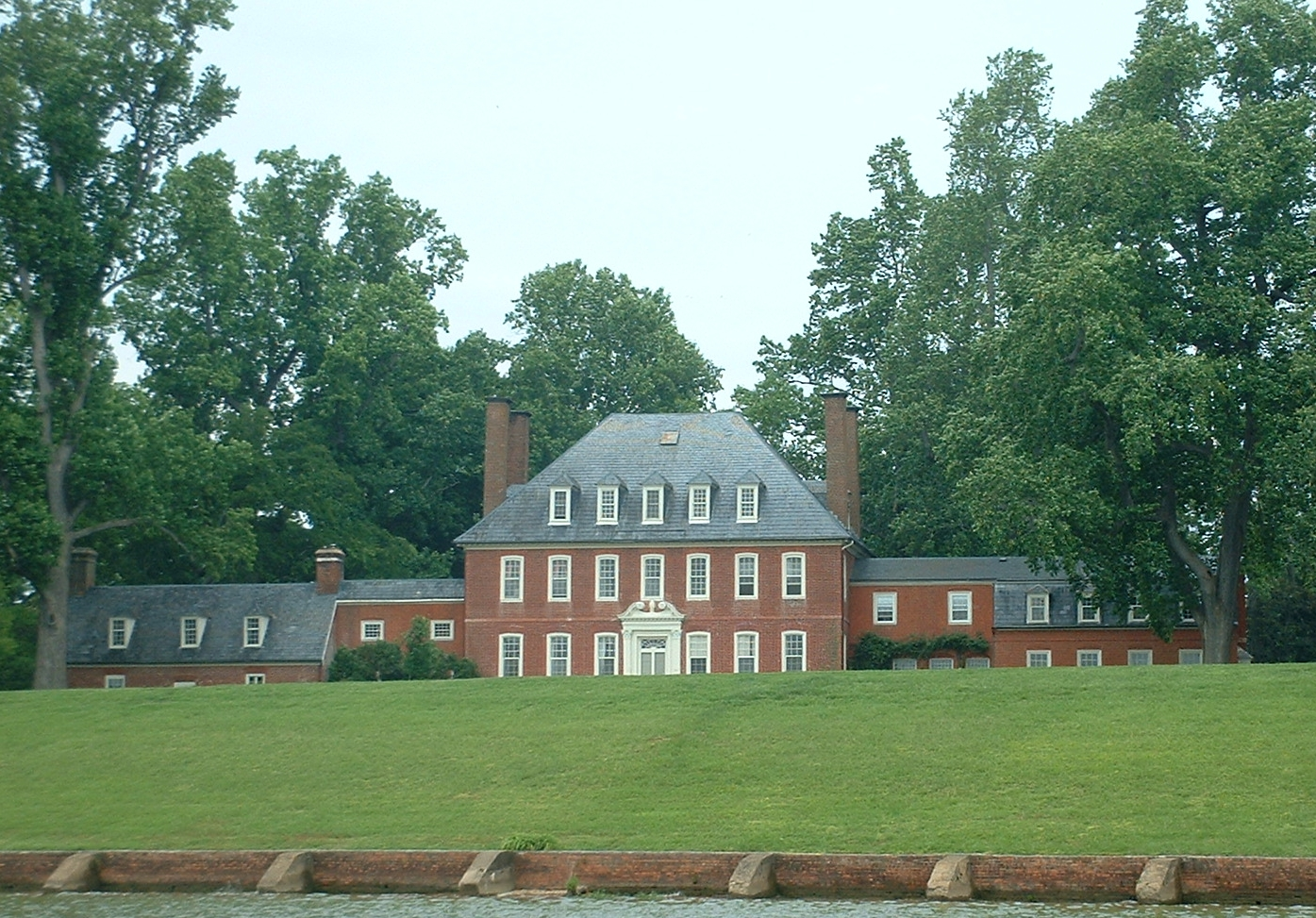
Westover Plantation, an example of Georgian architecture on the eastern James River, in Virginia

British colonial architecture are most visible in North America, the British West Indies, South Asia, Australia, New Zealand and South Africa.

- North America
  - American colonial architecture
    - Federal architecture
    - First Period architecture
    - Colonial Georgian architecture
  - British colonial architecture in Canada
- South Asia
  - British colonial architecture in India
  - British colonial architecture in Pakistan
  - British colonial architecture in Bangladesh
  - Colonial architecture in Sri Lanka
- Australia
  - Colonial architecture of Australia
    - Federation architecture
- Asia-Pacific
  - British colonial architecture in Hong Kong
  - British colonial architecture in Singapore
  - British Consulate at Takao

== French colonial architecture ==
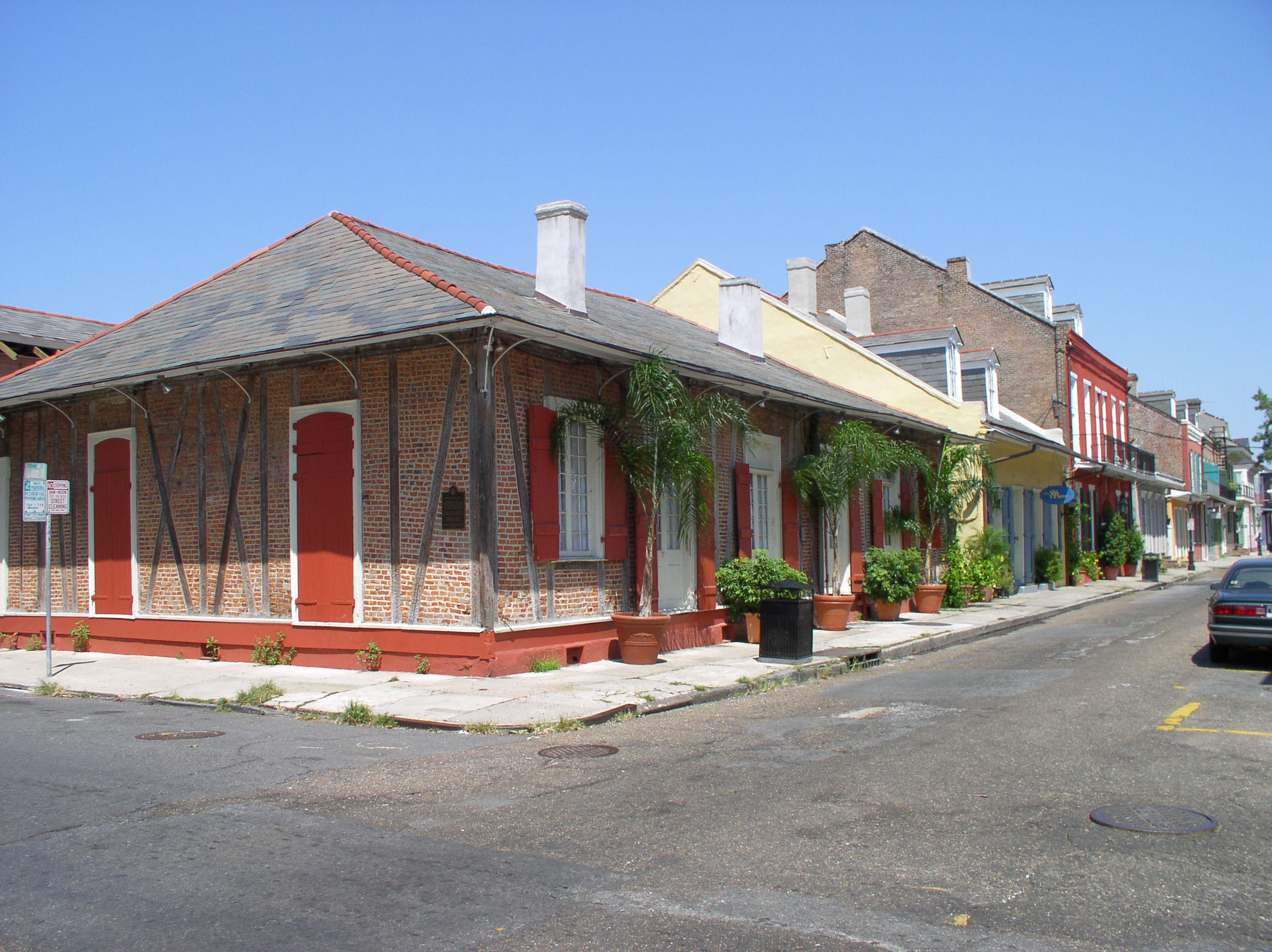
Gabriel Peyreaux House in New Orleans, built circa 1780 It is an example of poteaux-sur-solle construction.

French colonial architecture is most visible in North America and Indochina.

- Indochina
- North America
  - French colonial architecture in North America
- South Asia
  - French colonial architecture in India

== Dutch colonial architecture ==
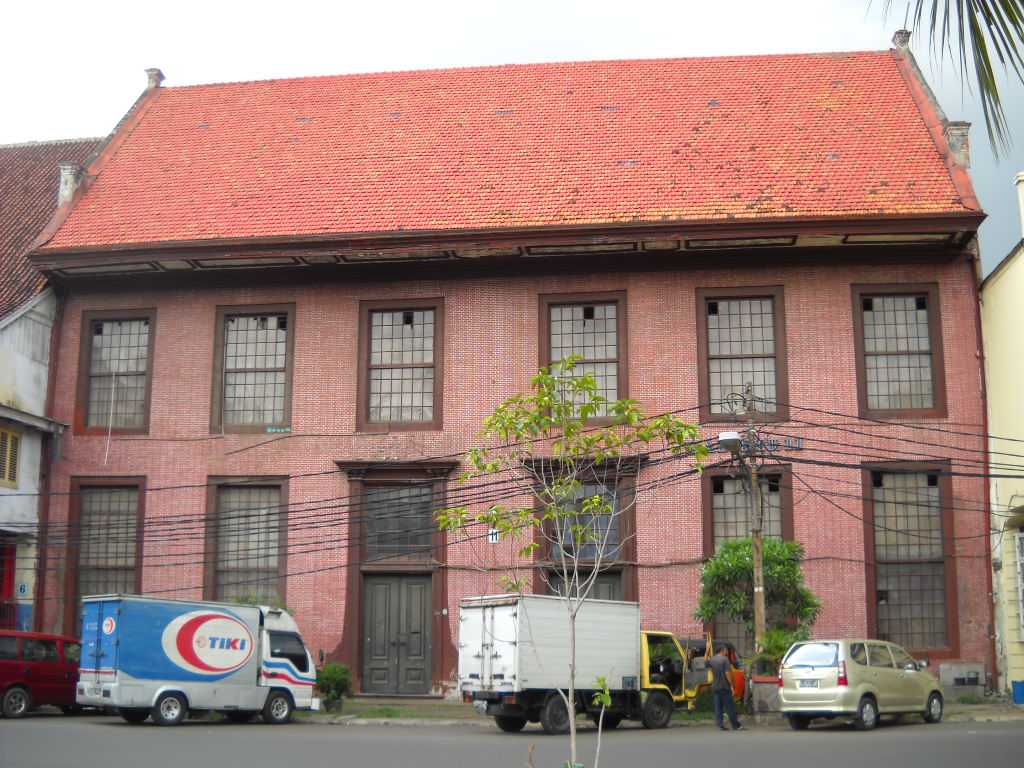
Toko Merah, an 18th-century Dutch colonial landmark in Jakarta, shows a typically Dutch high sash windows with split shutters.

Dutch colonial architecture is most visible in Indonesia (especially Java and Sumatra), the United States, South Asia, and South Africa. In Indonesia, formerly Dutch East Indies, colonial architecture was studied academically and had developed into a new tropical architecture form which emphasizes on conforming to the tropical climate of the Indies and not completely imitating the architectural language of the Dutch colonists.

- Indonesia
  - Dutch colonial architecture of Indonesia
    - Old Indies Style
    - Indies Empire style
    - New Indies Style
- North America
  - Dutch colonial architecture in North America
  - Dutch Colonial Revival architecture
- South Asia
  - Dutch colonial architecture in India
  - Colonial architecture in Sri Lanka
- South Africa
  - Cape Dutch architecture

== Russian colonial architecture ==
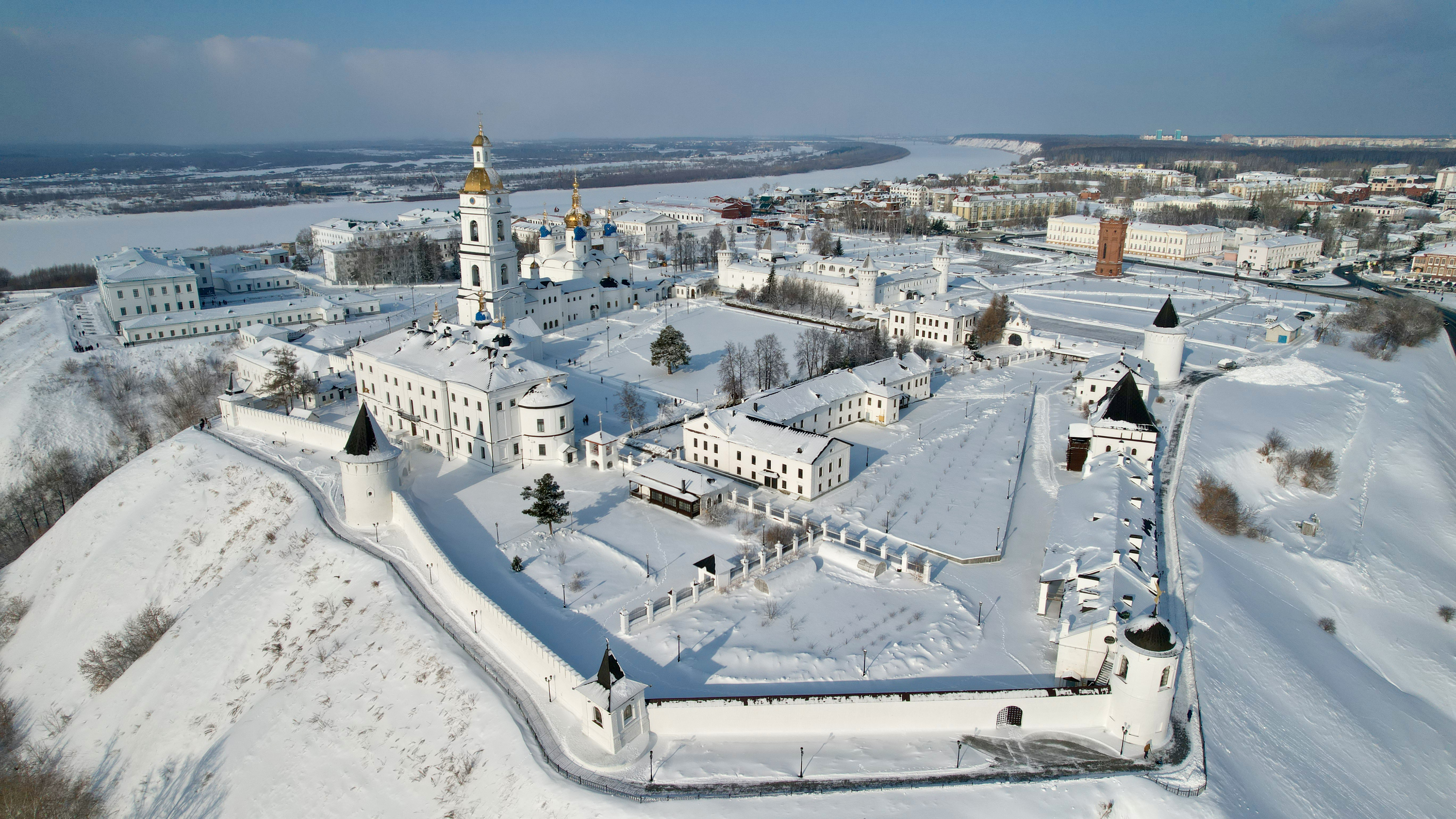
Tobolsk Kremlin

Russian colonial architecture is primarily represented in Siberia, Far East and Central Asia. The best example of Russian colonial architecture in Siberia is the architecture of Irkutsk, Tobolsk, Tomsk, Krasnoyarsk, Omsk and Yeniseysk. Russian colonial architecture in Siberia was primarily built out of wood due to the abundance of it in the region and is noticeable for its wooden carving.

- Siberia
  - Siberian baroque
  - Lace houses
- Central Asia
  - Soviet architecture in Central Asia
- Turkey
  - Baltic style of Kars

== Italian colonial architecture ==
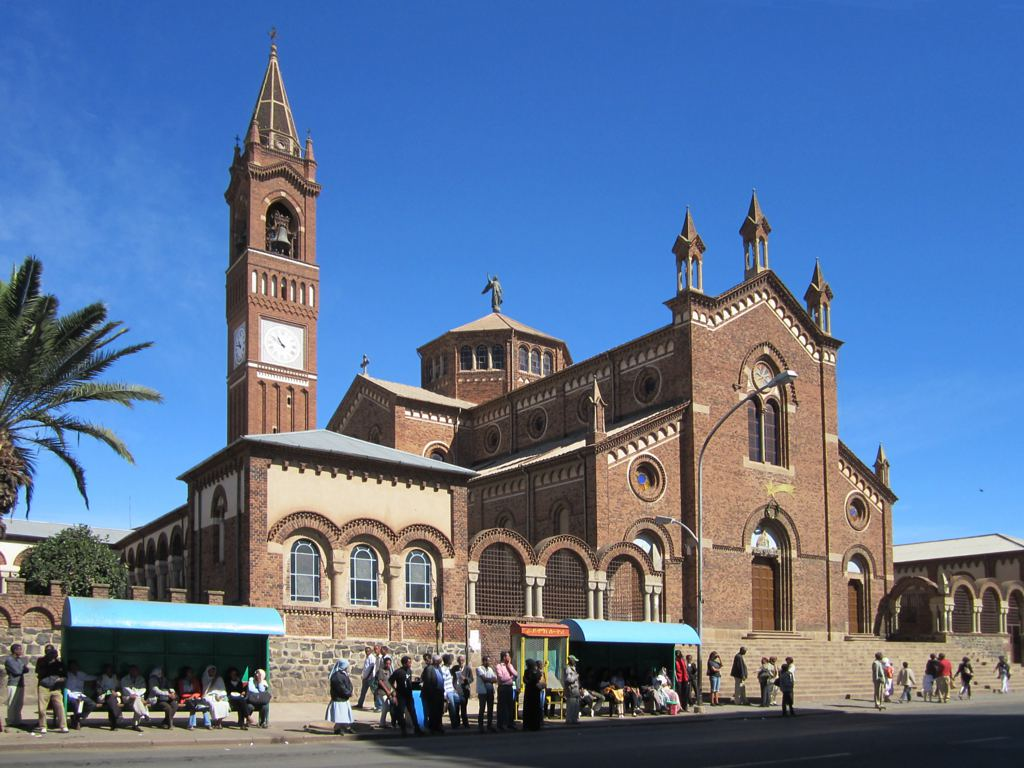
The Church of Our Lady of the Rosary in Asmara, Eritrea (1923)

Eritrea was Italy's first African colony. Its first capital, Massawa, contains a large amount of early Italian colonial architecture, characterized by historicism and inspiration from Venetian Gothic and Italian Neoclassical architecture. The colonial architecture and orthogonal street grid of Asmara, the colony's second capital, was inscribed as a UNESCO World Heritage Site in 2017. Much of the city's colonial architecture dates to the fascist era, during which Benito Mussolini encouraged architects and planners to transform the city into a "Little Rome".

Somalia also contains a wide range of Italian colonial architecture, dating back to its colonial era. In Mogadishu, the residence of most of the colony's eventual 50,000 Italian residents, colonial architects undertook large planning projects and erected monuments such as the still-extant triumphal arch dedicated to Umberto I, the largely destroyed Cathedral of Mogadiscio, and various government buildings. The Italian-built Villa Somalia remains Somalia's presidential residence. Unlike colonial schemes in Libya and Eritrea, Italian colonial authorities built within existing cities in Somalia, not building new villages or towns for settlers.

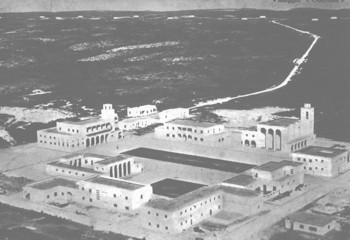
An aerial view of the Italian village of Oberdan (now known as Battah) in Libya

Before the consolidation of Italian Cyrenaica and Italian Tripolitania, Libya's colonial masters undertook significant building projects in Italian styles, such as the construction of Tripoli's Cathedral, built in a Venetian Gothic style. Following the founding of Italian Libya, Italian Fascist architecture became the standard for the massive infrastructural and settlement-related projects that Mussolini's Italy undertook. In cities such as Tripoli and Benghazi, colonial architects and urban planners undertook large-scale urban projects, such as the construction of Benghazi's monumental Lungomare (sea-walk), new urban districts for Italian settlers, and Catholic religious buildings, including Benghazi Cathedral. The fascist government's constructions were usually characterized by use of the Italian Rationalist and Neoclassical styles. Starting in 1938, the colony's Public Works Department sponsored the building of 27 new villages meant for Italian settlement, mostly in Cyrenaica, which epitomized a Rationalism informed by local Arab architectural mores. Giovanni Pellegrini, one of the most prominent designers of these agrarian villages, attempted to synthesize Arab and Italian architecture to settlements best fitted to Cyrenaica's arid climate.

Italy's occupation of the Dodecanese bore a significant amount of modernist and art deco buildings throughout the archipelago. Colonial architects also constructed several new towns and villages, such as Portolago, now known as Lakki. Unlike many of the built remnants of Italian colonialism in Africa, Italian architecture in the Dodecanese often remains in good repair.

Italy's brief colonial undertaking in Albania resulted in a prominent collection of Rationalist buildings, including the Bank of Albania, the Prime Minister's Office, and the National Theatre.

== See also ==
- Colonial Revival architecture
- American colonial architecture
