= Kennebunk Historic District =

Historic district in Maine, United States

- U.S. National Register of Historic Places
- U.S. Historic district
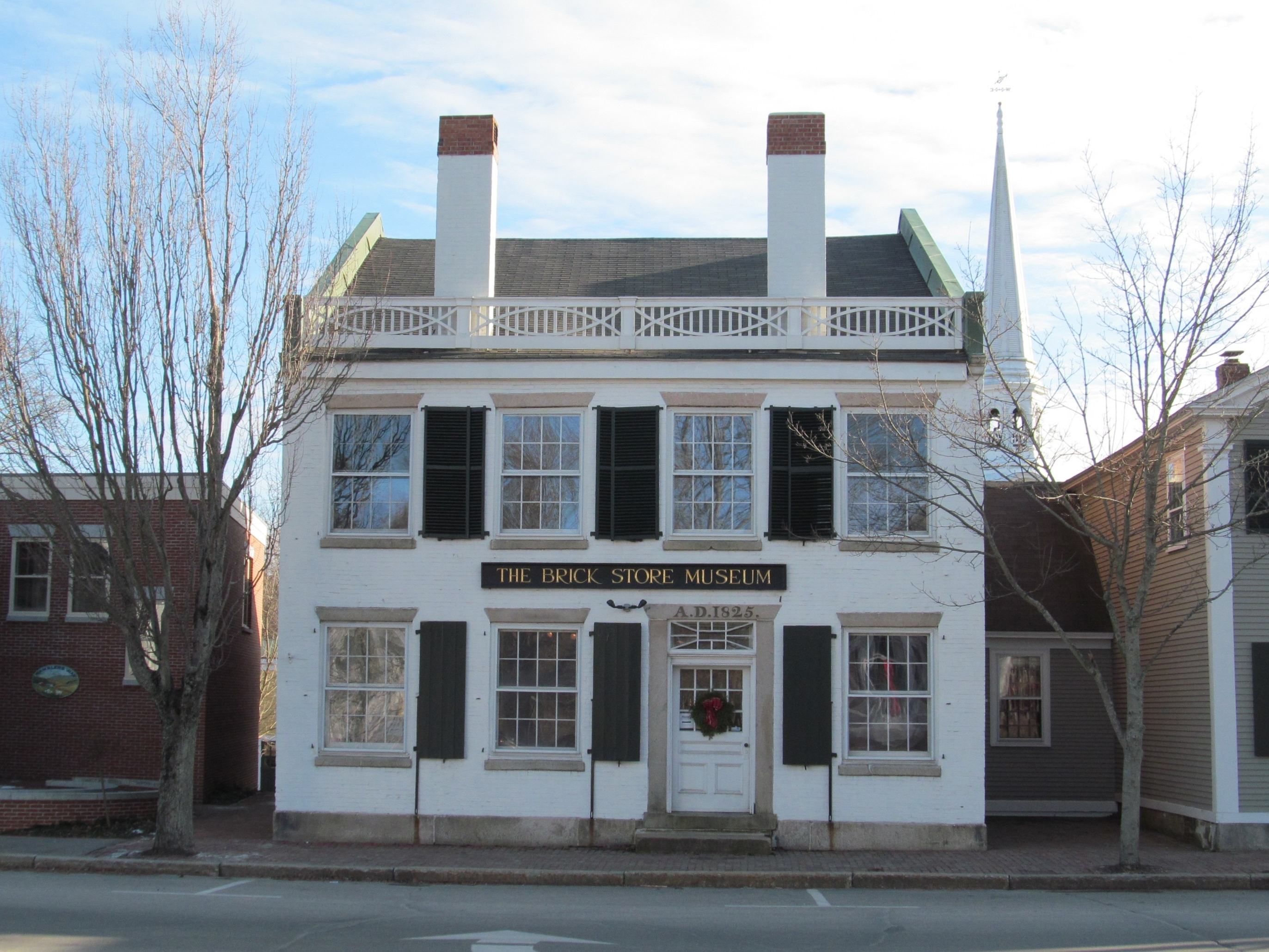
- The Brick Store Museum in Kennebunk Village

- Location within Maine Location within the United States
- Location: Both sides of ME 35 from Kennebunk River to U.S. 1, radiating streets at intersection, Kennebunk, Maine
- Coordinates: 43°23′16″N 70°32′10″W
- Area: 575 acres (233 ha)
- Architect: Multiple
- Architectural style: Mid 19th Century Revival, Late Victorian, Federal
- NRHP reference No.: 74000324
- Added to NRHP: June 5, 1974

The Kennebunk Historic District encompasses a large portion of the historic town center of Kennebunk, Maine. Established in 1736, the district includes a significant number of fairly high-style houses from the late 18th and early 19th centuries, when Kennebunk was at its height as a shipbuilding and maritime shipping center. The district was listed on the National Register of Historic Places in 1974.

== Description and history ==
The town of Kennebunk, Maine is located on the coast of southern Maine, between the Kennebunk River (the boundary with Kennebunkport) to the north, and the Little River, which forms the boundary with Wells. This area was part of Wells in the 17th and 18th centuries, and was set off in 1820. Its village center is located inland on the Mousam River, which roughly bisects the town. This area was first permanently settled in 1736, and a corridor between the Mousam and Kennebunk Rivers soon developed, along what is now Summer Street (Maine State Route 35). The village center is focused on the former Post Road, now United States Route 1, on the east side of the Mousam River. The town's historic shipyards, which have not survived, were located on the west bank of the Kennebunk River.

The historic district includes a significant portion of the Kennebunk village center, and stretches along SR 35 roughly to the Kennebunk Landing area at Durrell's Landing Road. The oldest houses in the district date to the 1750s and 1760s, including most notably the Lord Mansion at 20 Summer Street, whose older portion is an ell attached to a fine Federal period built in 1804. The northern portion of Summer Street is lined with houses built primarily in the first half of the 19th century for ship's captains. The most elaborate and eye-catching of these is the so-called "Wedding Cake House", built in 1826 for a shipyard owner, and given an elaborate Gothic Revival treatment in the 1850s. The 1776 Barnard Tavern (#10 on the nomination form) was taken down in 2023-24.

== See also ==
- National Register of Historic Places listings in York County, Maine
