= Guido Ferrazza =

Italian architect (1887–1961)

- Born: 19 March 1887; Bocenago, Austria-Hungary
- Died: 1 February 1961 (aged 73); Cassano d'Adda, Province of Milan, Italy
- Education: Polytechnic University of Milan; Brera Academy
- Occupations: Architect, urban planner

Guido Ferrazza (19 March 1887 – 1 February 1961) was an Italian architect and urban planner.

== Life and career ==
A native of Trentino, Ferrazza graduated in civil architecture from the Regio Istituto Tecnico Superiore in 1912 and obtained a teaching qualification in architectural drawing from the Academy of Fine Arts in Bologna.

Ferrazza frequently collaborated with Alberto Alpago-Novello and Ottavio Cabiati, and was one of the leading professionals active in Cyrenaica and Eritrea in the context of colonial architecture. From 1939 to 1941, he worked in Addis Ababa, Ethiopia.

Ferrazza returned to Italy in July 1943 and took part in the Resistance in Lombardy, where he was a member of the National Liberation Committee for Northern Italy. From 1946 to 1949, he worked for the regional office of public works in Trentino-Alto Adige.

Between 1949 and 1951, Ferrazza directed the implementation of the master plan for San Juan, Argentina.

Ferrazza died on 1 February 1961 in Cassano d'Adda in a railway accident.

== Sources ==
- Burg, Annegret (1991). Novecento milanese. Milan: Motta.
- Graziella Leyla Ciagà, ed. (2003). Gli archivi di architettura in Lombardia. Censimento delle fonti. Milan: Centro di Alti Studi sulle Arti Visive.
- Giuliano Gresleri; Pier Giorgio Masseretti; Stefano Zagnoni, eds. (1993). Architettura italiana d'oltremare 1870–1940. Venice: Marsilio.
- Santoianni, Vittorio (2008). Il Razionalismo nelle colonie italiane 1928–1943. La «nuova architettura» delle Terre d'Oltremare (PDF). Naples: Università di Napoli.
- Talamona, Marida (1996). "FERRAZZA, Guido". Dizionario Biografico degli Italiani. Vol. 46. Istituto dell'Enciclopedia Italiana.
- Zanella, Francesca (2002). Alpago Novello, Cabiati e Ferrazza 1912–1935. Milan: Electa.
