= Ottavio Cabiati =

Italian architect (1889–1956)

- Born: 25 May 1889; Florence, Kingdom of Italy
- Died: 31 October 1956 (aged 67); Seregno, Province of Milan, Italy
- Education: Polytechnic University of Milan; Brera Academy
- Occupations: Architect, urban planner

Ottavio Cabiati (25 May 1889 – 31 October 1956) was an Italian architect and urban planner.

== Life and career ==
Born in Florence to a family from Brianza and orphaned of his father at an early age, Cabiati spent his childhood in Seregno. After attending classical high school in Como, he enrolled in 1908 at the Regio Istituto Tecnico Superiore in Milan and later at the Brera Academy, completing his studies in 1913.

Following early professional experiences, he served in World War I. Upon returning in 1919, he opened an architecture firm in Milan with former classmates Alberto Alpago-Novello and Guido Ferrazza.

Cabiati's work reflected the Novecento style, prominent in Milan at the time. He was also active in urban planning and participated in the 1927 competition for Milan's new master plan with the "Club degli Urbanisti" (De Finetti, Muzio, and others), earning second prize with the project Forma Urbis Mediolani.

Cabiati is also known for his extensive work in ecclesiastical architecture, including the church of Santi Silvestro e Martino in Milan and the church of Santi Pietro e Paolo in San Giuliano Milanese. Since 1950, he has been a member of the Pontifical Commission for Sacred Art.

He died in Seregno in a car accident on 31 October 1956.

== Sources ==
- Burg, Annegret (1991). Novecento milanese. Milan: Motta.
- Franco Cajani, ed. (1991). Ottavio Cabiati e il suo tempo. Besana Brianza: GR Edizioni.
- Graziella Leyla Ciagà, ed. (2003). Gli archivi di architettura in Lombardia. Censimento delle fonti. Milan: Centro di Alti Studi sulle Arti Visive.
- Favole, Paolo (1972). "CABIATI, Ottavio". Dizionario Biografico degli Italiani. Vol. 15. Istituto dell'Enciclopedia Italiana.
- Giuliano Gresleri; Pier Giorgio Masseretti; Stefano Zagnoni, eds. (1993). Architettura italiana d'oltremare 1870-1940. Venice: Marsilio.
- Zanella, Francesca (2002). Alpago Novello, Cabiati e Ferrazza 1912-1935. Milan: Electa.
