= Alberto Alpago-Novello =

Italian architect (1889–1985)

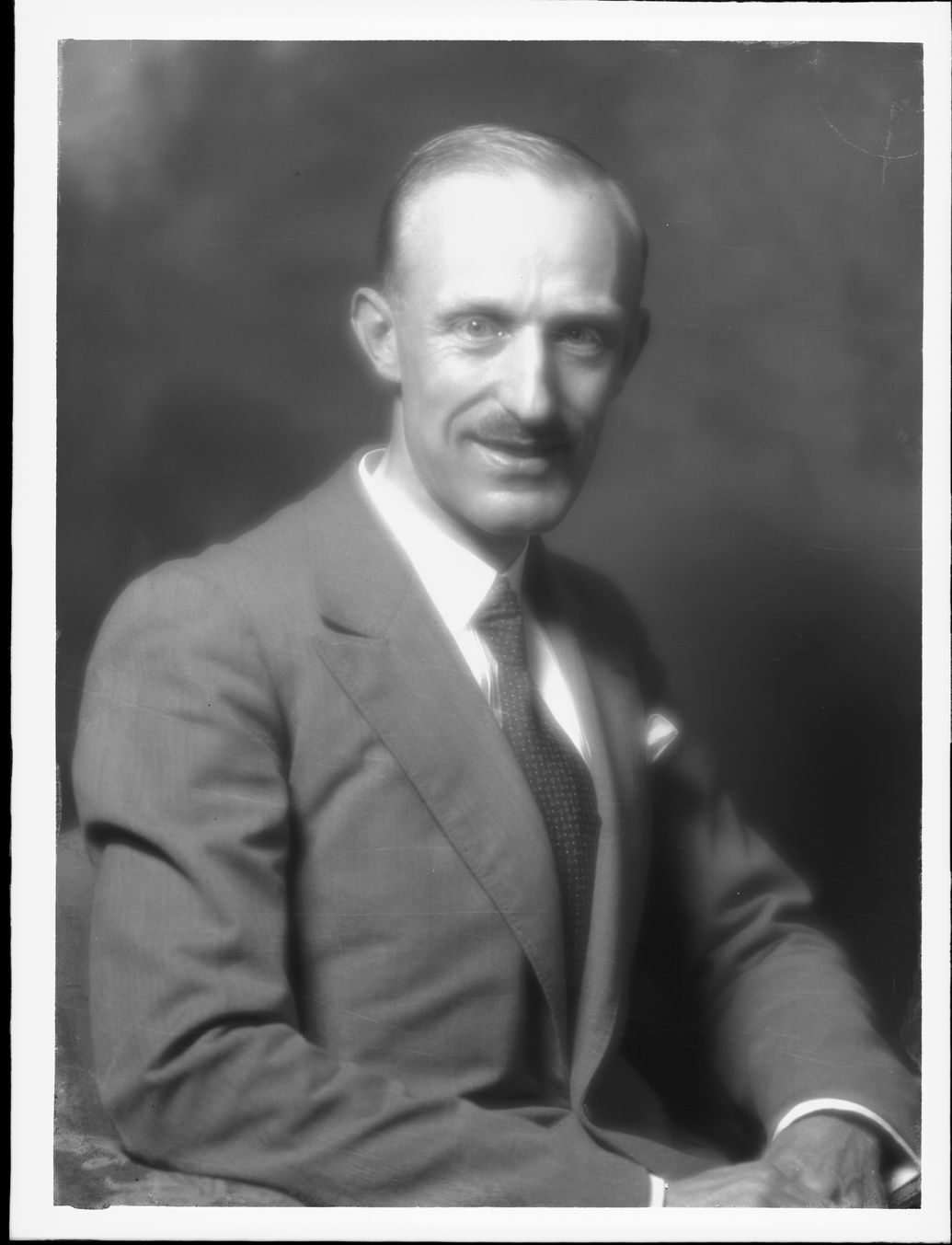
- Alpago-Novello in 1929
- Born: 27 June 1889; Feltre, Province of Belluno, Kingdom of Italy
- Died: 1985 (aged 95–96)
- Education: Polytechnic University of Milan; Brera Academy
- Occupations: Architect, urban planner
- Children: Adriano Alpago-Novello
- Father: Luigi Alpago-Novello

Alberto Alpago-Novello (27 June 1889 – 1985) was an Italian architect and urban planner.

== Life and career ==
Alpago-Novello was educated at the Polytechnic University of Milan and the Brera Academy. After World War I, he opened a studio in Milan with Ottavio Cabiati and Guido Ferrazza, with whom he designed numerous projects in Italy and in the colonies (Libya, Eritrea), distinguishing himself in urban planning, public architecture, and monumental works. He was among the founders of the "Club degli Urbanisti".

After the war, he focused on historical, literary, and archaeological work in the Belluno area, publishing research, contributing to journals such as Domus, and directing the journal Archivio storico di Feltre, Belluno, Cadore. He was also an expert in gnomonics and edited the posthumous publication of Piero Portaluppi's Gnomonica atellana.

== Sources ==
- Burg, Annegret (1991). Novecento milanese. Milan: Motta.
- Giuliano Gresleri; Pier Giorgio Masseretti; Stefano Zagnoni, eds. (1993). Architettura italiana d'oltremare 1870-1940. Venice: Marsilio.
- Iacobone, Damiano (2023). Alberto Alpago-Novello 1889-1985. Architetture a Belluno. Milan: Silvana.
- Santoianni, Vittorio (2008). Il Razionalismo nelle colonie italiane 1928-1943. La «nuova architettura» delle Terre d'Oltremare (PDF). Naples: Università di Napoli.
- Zanella, Francesca (2002). Alpago Novello, Cabiati e Ferrazza 1912-1935. Milan: Electa.
