= LFT =

LFT may refer to:

== Medicine and psychology ==
- Lateral flow test, an immunochromatography device
- Liver function tests, a hepatic blood panel
- Low frustration tolerance, the inability to tolerate stress

== Miscellaneous science and technology ==
- Lattice field theory, in quantum mechanics
- Layer four traceroute, network analysis software
- Ligand field theory, of molecular orbitals
- Long fiber thermoplastic
- Luyten Five-Tenths catalogue, of stars

== Music ==
- "LFT", a song on Avalanche (Quadron album)

== Schools ==
- Lycée Français de Tananarive, Madagascar
- Lycée Français Toronto, Canada
- Lycée Français de Tripoli, Libya

== Transportation ==
- Lafayette station (Louisiana), United States (Amtrak station code: LFT)
- Lafayette Regional Airport, United States (IATA code: LFT)
