= Ean Libya =

Arabic news website

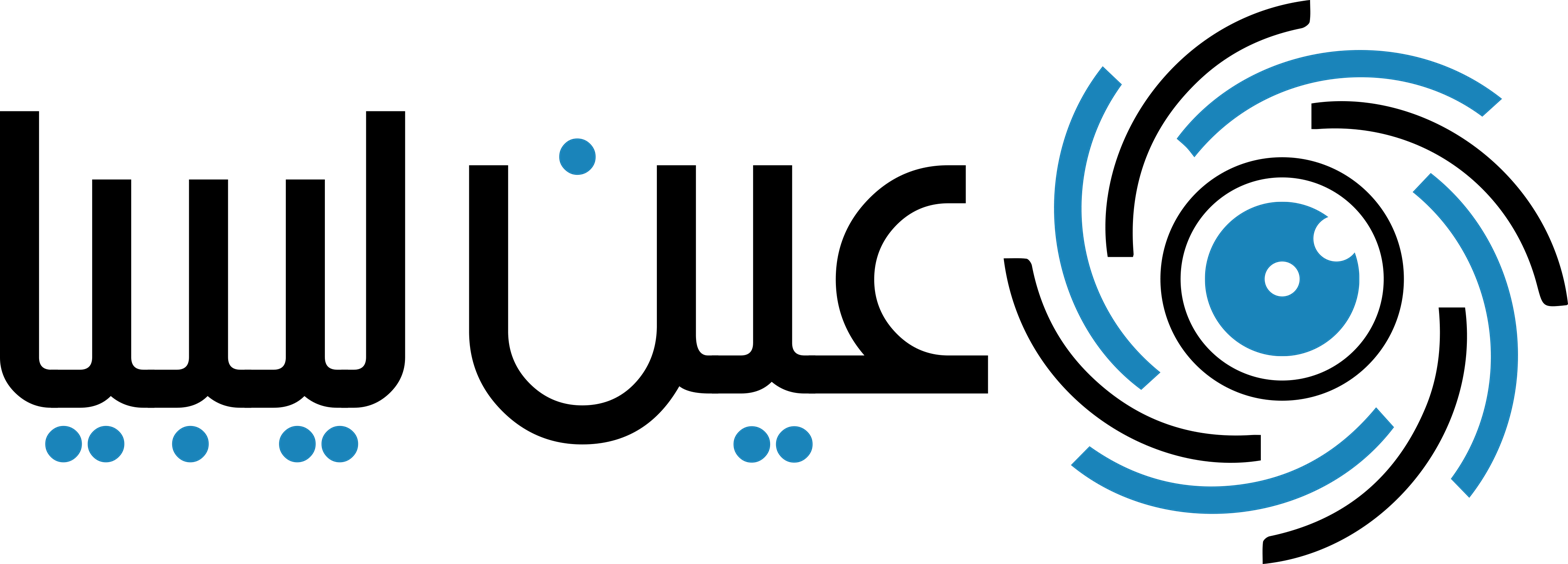
- Website type: News
- Available in: Arabic
- Website: Ean Libya
- Commercial: Yes
- Registration: None
- Launched: 2012; 14 years ago
- Current status: Online

Ean Libya (Arabic: عين ليبيا) is an online, Tripoli based Arabic language news website focusing on events in Libya, North Africa. It posted its first article on November 3, 2011.

The Editor in Chief is Dr Ramadan Mohammed supported by Editorial Director Ali Hussein.
