= Galleria De Bono =

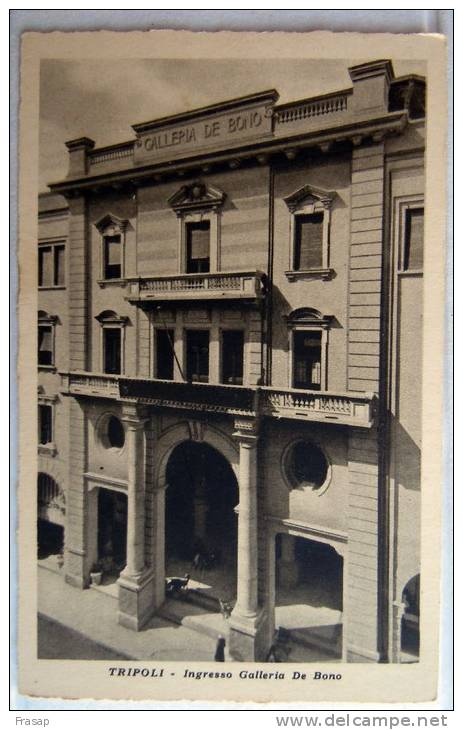
- Galleria De Bono in Tripoli
- Click on the map for a fullscreen view

General information
- Architectural style: Neoclassical
- Location: Tripoli, Libya
- Coordinates: 32°53′37″N 13°10′55″E

The Galleria De Bono is a historic building located in Tripoli, Libya.

== History ==
The building was erected at the time of Italian Libya, and was named after Emilio De Bono.

== Description ==
The arcade has the shape of a large octagon which can be accessed through four specular entrances. The two main entrances connect the arcade to the former Via Costanzo Ciano and Corso Vittorio Emanuele. The large octagonal square at centre of the arcade, now devoid of roofs, was originally covered by a structure made of steel and glass.
