= Wadi Mejenin Dam =

Dam in Tripoli, Libya

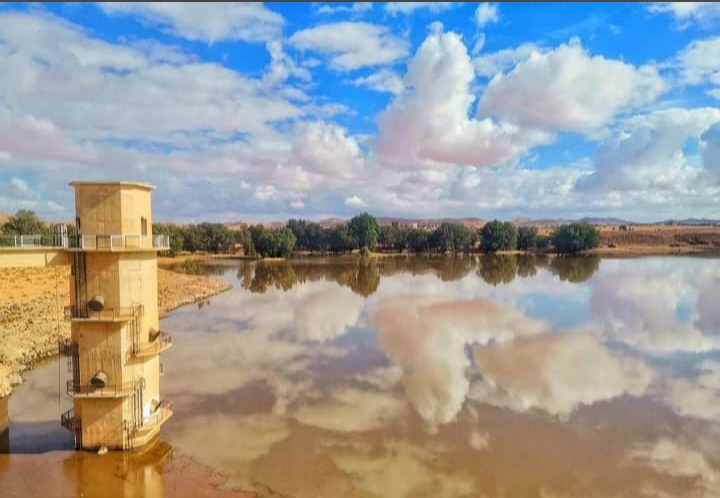

- Location within Libya
- Country: Libya
- Location: Tripoli
- Coordinates: 32°17′39″N 13°14′51″E
- Status: Operational
- Opening date: 1972

Dam and spillways
- Impounds: Wadi Mejenin
- Height: 42 m (138 ft)

Reservoir
- Total capacity: 58,000,000 m^{3} (47,021 acre⋅ft)
- Surface area: 6 km^{2} (2 sq mi)

The Wadi Mejenin Dam is an embankment dam located on Wadi Mejenin, 64 km (40 mi) south of Tripoli in the Jabal al Gharbi District of Libya. Completed in 1972, the primary purpose of the dam is water supply for irrigation and flood control.
