= Lycée Français de Tripoli =

Location
- Tripoli; Libya

Information
- School type: International School
- Closed: 2012/13
- Language: French

Lycée Français de Tripoli (LFT) is a French international school in Tripoli, Libya. It serves levels maternelle through lycée (senior high school/sixth form).

It closed during the 2012–2013 school year due to the Libyan Crisis, and has remained closed.
