= Christianity in Libya =

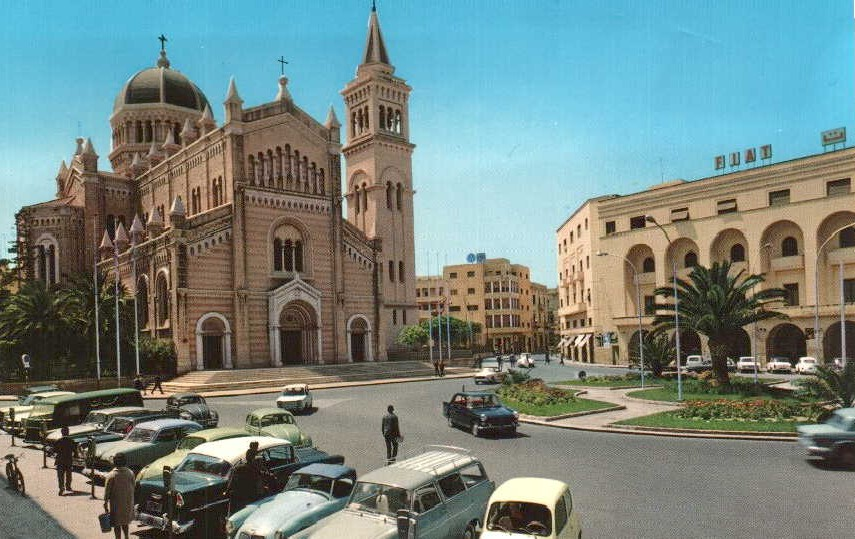
- The Cathedral of Tripoli in the 1960s.

Total population
- 200,000 (2020)

Religions
- Predominantly Coptic Orthodox

Languages
- Libyan Arabic, Egyptian Arabic, Languages of Italy

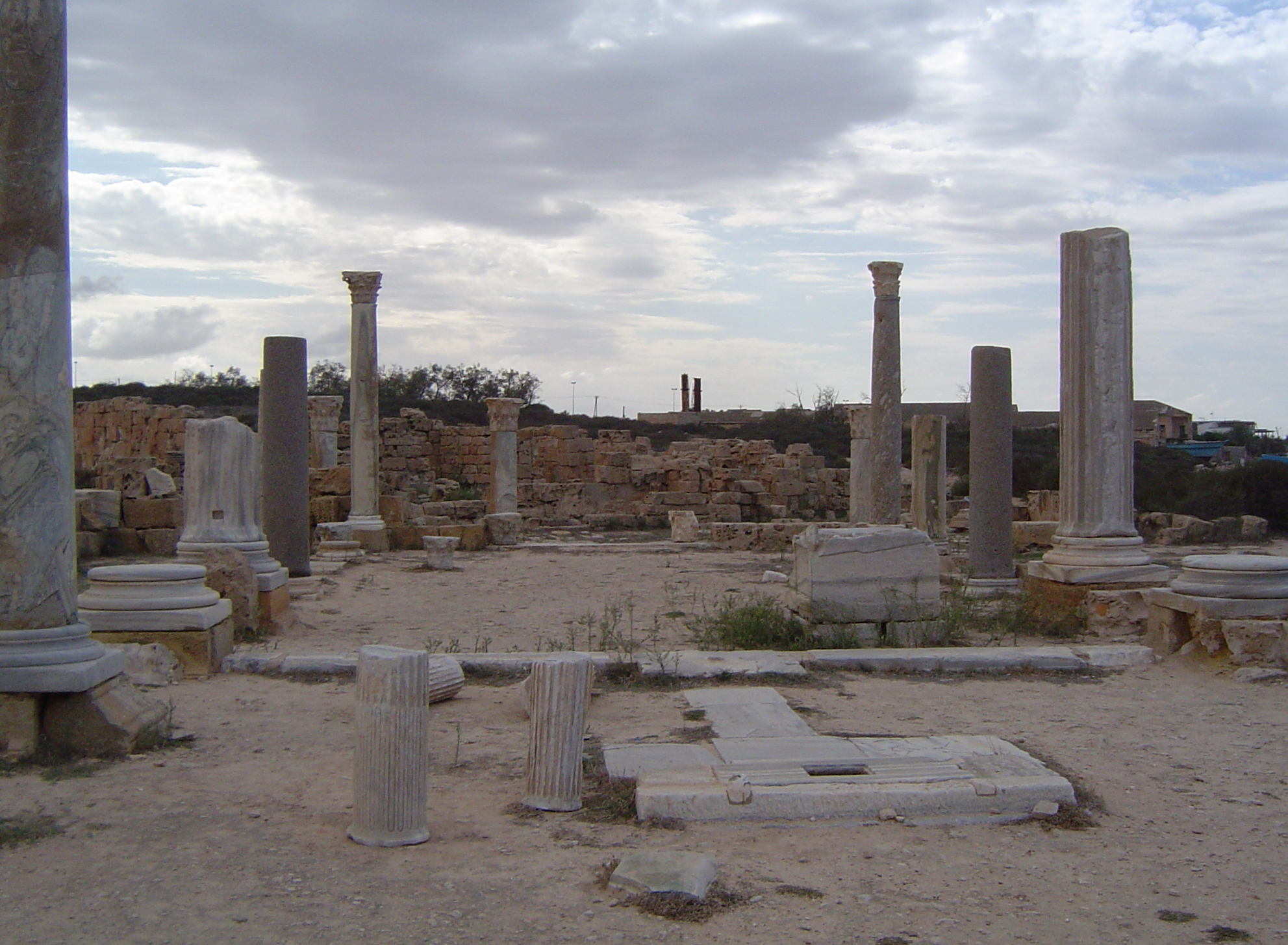
The ruins of the Basilica of Justinian in Sabratha

Christianity is a minority religion in Libya. It has been present in Tripolitania and Cyrenaica since Roman times.

== Characteristics ==
The largest Christian group in Libya is the Coptic Orthodox Church (Copts in Libya). The Coptic Church is known to have historical roots in Libya long before the Arabs advanced westward from Egypt into Libya. The next largest denomination is Roman Catholicism. Orthodox communities include Egyptian Copts, Russian Orthodox, and Greek Orthodox. There is one Anglican congregation in Tripoli, made up mainly of African immigrant workers, that belongs to the Egyptian Anglican diocese. The Anglican bishop of Libya has his seat in Cairo. There is also a priest in Sabha.

There are relatively peaceful relations between Christians and Muslims in Libya. However, there are restrictions for Christian religious activity. It is prohibited to proselytize Muslims, thus a non-Muslim man must convert to Islam if he wants to marry a Muslim woman. Religious literature is restricted. In spite of these legal restrictions, a 2015 estimate counted some 1,500 Christian believers from a Muslim background residing in the country.

== Christian denominations ==
=== Coptic Orthodox Church ===
In 2022, more than half of Libya's Christian population were Copts.

Historically speaking, Christianity spread to the Pentapolis in North Africa from Egypt; Synesius of Cyrene (370–414), bishop of Ptolemais, received his instruction at Alexandria in both the Catechetical School and the Museion, and he entertained a great deal of reverence and affection for Hypatia, the last pagan Neoplatonists, whose classes he had attended. Synesius was raised to the episcopate by Theophilus, patriarch of Alexandria, in 410. The Council of Nicaea in 325 made Cyrenaica an ecclesiastical province of the See of Alexandria. The Pope of Alexandria to this day includes the Pentapolis in his title as an area within his jurisdiction.

The Coptic congregations in several countries were under the ancient Eparchy of the Western Pentapolis, which was part of the Coptic Orthodox Church for centuries until the thirteenth century.

In 1971 Pope Shenouda III reinstated it as part of the Eparchy of Metropolitan Bishop Pachomius, Metropolitan of the Holy Metropolis of Beheira (Thmuis & Hermopolis Parva), (Buto), Mariout (Mareotis), Marsa Matruh (Paraetonium), (Apis), Patriarchal Exarch of the Ancient Metropolis of Libya: (Livis, Marmarica, Darnis & Tripolitania) & Titular Metropolitan Archbishop of the Great and Ancient Metropolis of Pentapolis: (Cyren), (Appollonia), (Ptolemais), (Berenice) and (Arsinoe).

This was one among a chain of many restructuring of several eparchies by Pope Shenouda III, while some of them were incorporated into the jurisdiction of others, especially those who were within an uncovered region or which were part of a Metropolis that became extinct, or by dividing large eparchies into smaller more manageable eparchies. This was also a part of the restructuring of the Church as a whole.

They are currently three Coptic Orthodox Churches in Libya: one in Tripoli, Libya (Saint Mark's), one in Benghazi, Libya (Saint Antonios - two priests), and one in Misrata, Libya (Saint Mary and Saint George).

=== Catholic Church ===
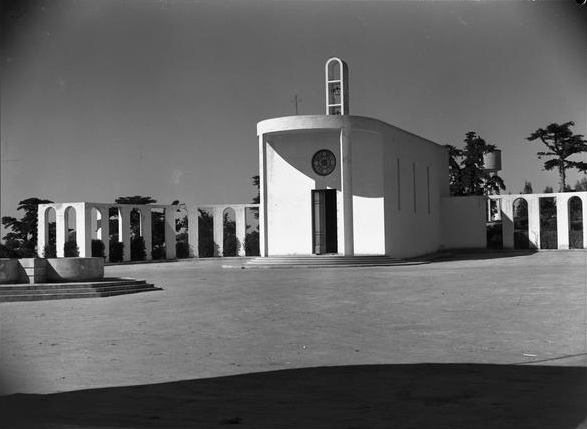
Catholic Church of Massah in 1940

In 2022, there were approximately, 3,500 Catholics in the country. This is down from previous years.

The Church of Santa Maria degli Angeli (Our Lady of the Angels) in the Old City – Medina of Tripoli was founded in 1645 and, with the permission of the Sultan of Constantinople, the Church of the Immaculate Conception was founded in Benghazi in 1858. Before World War II the number of Catholics increased in Libya due to Italian colonialism. The Catholic Cathedral of Tripoli (built in the 1930s) was converted to a mosque. Catholic Vicariates Apostolic exist in Benghazi, Derna and Tripoli. There is a Prefecture Apostolic in Misrata.

There are two Bishops, one in Tripoli (Bishop Giovanni Innocenzo Martinelli – serving the Italian community in the Church of San Francisco in Dhahra). and one in Benghazi (Bishop Sylvester Carmel Magro – serving the Maltese community in the Church of the Immaculate Conception).

In Libya currently, there are four territorial jurisdictions – three Apostolic Administrations and one Apostolic Prefecture:

- Apostolic Vicariate of Benghazi
- Apostolic Vicariate of Derna
- Apostolic Vicariate of Tripoli
- Apostolic Prefecture of Misrata

=== Church Protestant ===
There is an Anglican congregation in Tripoli, composed mainly of African migrant workers, which belongs to the Egyptian Anglican diocese. The Anglican bishop of Libya is based in Cairo. There is a pastor in Sabha. There are Pentecostal worship groups in Libya in places like Tripoli and Benghazi. These churches are primarily worship groups who gather together every Friday, led by Pentecostal pastors. Though these groups are not officially approved by the government of Libya, they practice their faith without any interference from the government. The following are the two known Pentecostal worship places:

- Indian Prayer Fellowship, Tripoli
- Global Faith Fellowship, Misrata

=== Greek Orthodox Church ===
As of 2011 there were about 1,000 in Tripoli and 500 in Benghazi . Churches reopened in 2021 after the civil The Holy Sacred Archdiocese of Tripoli and all Libya is under the jurisdiction of the Greek Orthodox Patriarchate of Alexandria and All Africa.

== Persecution ==
In February 2014, east of Benghazi, seven Coptic Christians were dragged out of their houses in the middle of the night and shot dead execution-style by Islamic State of Iraq and the Levant (ISIL).

On January 12, 2015, twenty-one Coptic Christians were abducted by forces of ISIL. On February 15, 2015, those 21 Christians were executed by ISIL shown in a video titled "A Message Signed with Blood to the Nation of the Cross." In 2023, Pope Francis announced that the men would be commemorated by the Catholic Church and listed within the Roman Martyrology.

On April 19, 2015, ISIL released another video in which they executed about 30 Ethiopian Christians.

In 2023, six Protestant Christian converts were sentenced to death for proselytizing.

In 2023, Libya was ranked as the 3rd most dangerous country in the world to be a Christian.

== See also ==
- Religion in Libya
- Catholic Church in Libya
- Protestantism in Libya
- Christianity in Africa
- Roman Catholic Church
  - Roman Catholicism in Africa
- Coptic Orthodox Church
  - Coptic Orthodoxy in Africa
