= List of Catholic dioceses in Libya =

The Catholic Church in Libya consists solely of Latin exempt missionary pre-diocesan jurisdictions, so there is no ecclesiastical province as they are all immediately subject to the Holy See and its missionary Roman Congregation Propaganda Fide.
There is no national episcopal conference, but all Libyan sees are members of the Regional Episcopal Conference of North Africa (like those of its host Morocco as well as Algeria, Tunisia and Western Sahara).

There formally is also an Apostolic Nunciature as papal diplomatic representation (embassy-level) in Libya, but it's vested abroad, currently in the Apostolic Nunciature to Malta.

== Current Latin jurisdictions ==
all pre-diocesan and missionary, hence exempt

entitled to a titular bishop

- Apostolic Vicariate of Benghazi
- Apostolic Vicariate of Derna
- Apostolic Vicariate of Tripoli

other

- Apostolic Prefecture of Misrata

== Defunct jurisdictions ==
All Ancient (arch)dioceses faded but were nominally restored as Latin titular sees :

- A Metropolitan Titular archbishopric : Archdiocese of Darnis
- twenty-three Titular bishoprics : Diocese of Ammoniace, Diocese of Antiphræ, Diocese of Antipyrgos, Diocese of Barca, Diocese of Berenice, Diocese of Boreum, Diocese of Cyrene, Diocese of Dystis, Diocese of Erythrum, Diocese of Gergis, Diocese of Gigthi, Diocese of Leptis Magna, Diocese of Oëa, Diocese of Olbia (Libya), Diocese of Parætonium, Diocese of Ptolemais in Libya, Diocese of Sabrata, Diocese of Sinnipsa, Diocese of Sozusa in Libya, Diocese of Tacapæ, Diocese of Teuchira, Diocese of Villamagna in Tripolitana, Diocese of Zagylis.

There are no other former jurisdictions without current successor.

== See also ==
- List of Catholic dioceses (structured view)

== Sources and external links ==
- GCatholic.org - data for all sections.
- Catholic-Hierarchy entry.
