= Catholic Church in Libya =

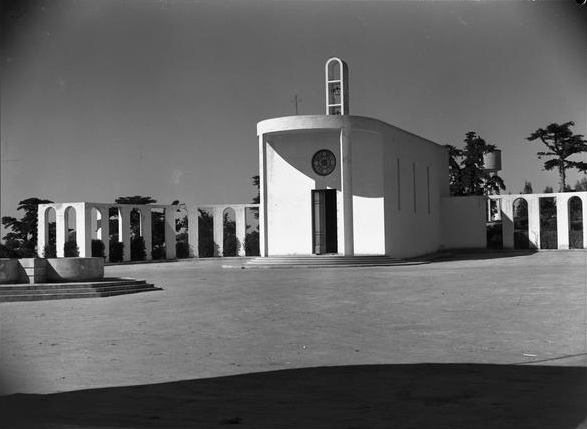
Catholic Church of Massah in 1940

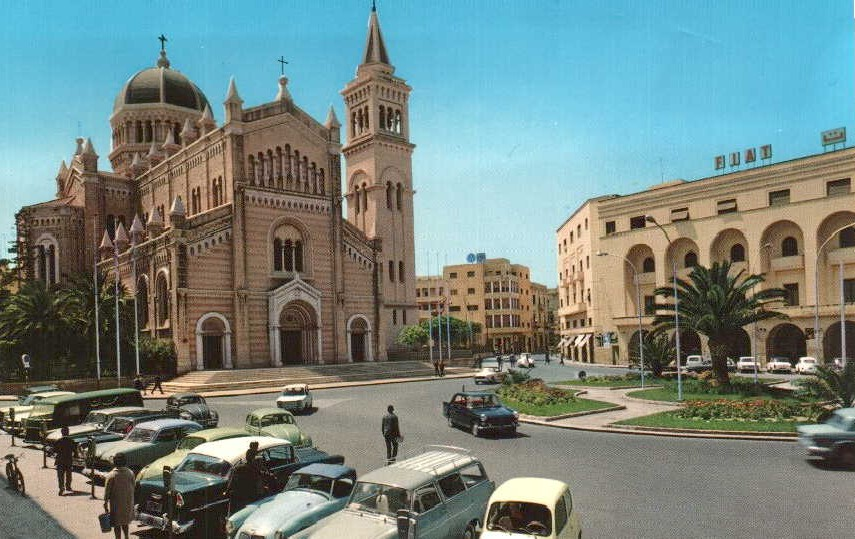
The Cathedral of Tripoli in the 1960s.

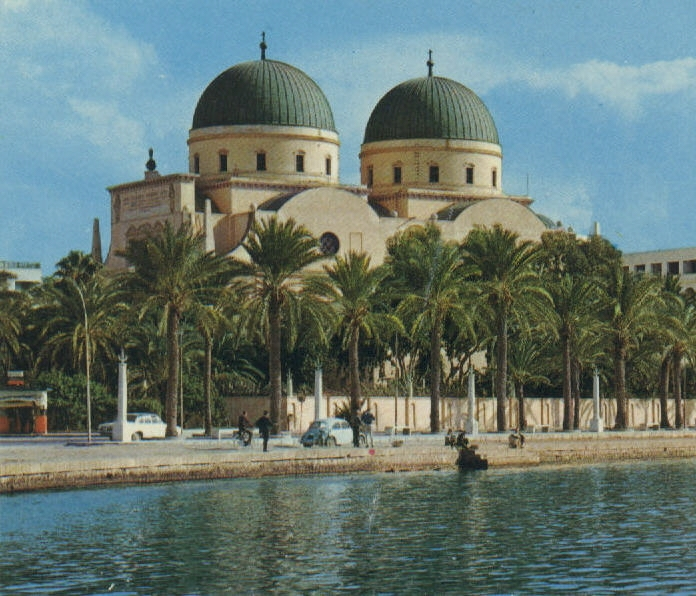
A view of Benghazi Cathedral in the 1960s, along the city's corniche.

The Catholic Church in Libya is part of the worldwide Catholic Church (particularly the Latin Church), under the spiritual leadership of the Pope in Rome.

== Characteristics ==
Among the Catholics are Italian Libyans and Maltese Libyans. Thousands of Filipino Catholic nurses moved to Libya during the 1980s and 1990s. The Italians were the majority of the Catholics in Libya until their expulsion in 1969 by Colonel Gaddafi.

There are no dioceses in Libya, but there are four territorial jurisdictions - three Apostolic Administrations and one Apostolic Prefecture.

- Apostolic Vicariate of Benghazi
- Apostolic Vicariate of Derna
- Apostolic Vicariate of Tripoli
- Apostolic Prefecture of Misrata

== History ==
Christianity has been present in Libya since Roman times. Saint Francis of Assisi brought his faith to Tripoli in the Middle Ages.

The Church of Santa Maria degli Angeli (Our Lady of the Angels) in the Old City - Medina of Tripoli was founded in 1645 and, with the permission of the Sultan of Constantinople, the Church of the Immaculate Conception was founded in Benghazi in 1858.

Before World War II the number of Catholics increased in Libya due to its status as an Italian colony, but the Catholic Cathedral of Tripoli (built in the 1920s) was converted to a mosque in the 1990s by Muammar Gaddafi's regime. The other Catholic cathedral in Libya, the Benghazi Cathedral is under renovation as a stock exchange.

== 21st century ==
The Catholic population in Libya was estimated to number 100,000 in 2012 many of them are mostly of Italian and Maltese ancestry. In 2017 there were only 300 Catholics in Libya. In 2023, it is believed that there are less than 20,500 Catholics in the country.

There are two Catholic churches in Libya, the Church of San Francesco in Tripoli (led until 2017 by Giovanni Innocenzo Martinelli) and the Maria Immacolata Parish Church in Benghazi, both of which are led by Franciscan priests from the Province of St. Paul the Apostle (Malta). Each church is made up of "personal parishes" based on language, with each personal parish assigned its own priest.

== See also ==
- Religion in Libya
- Christianity in Libya
- Protestantism in Libya
- Copts in Libya
- Italian Libyans
