= Matrouh Governorate =

Governorate of Egypt

- Governorate
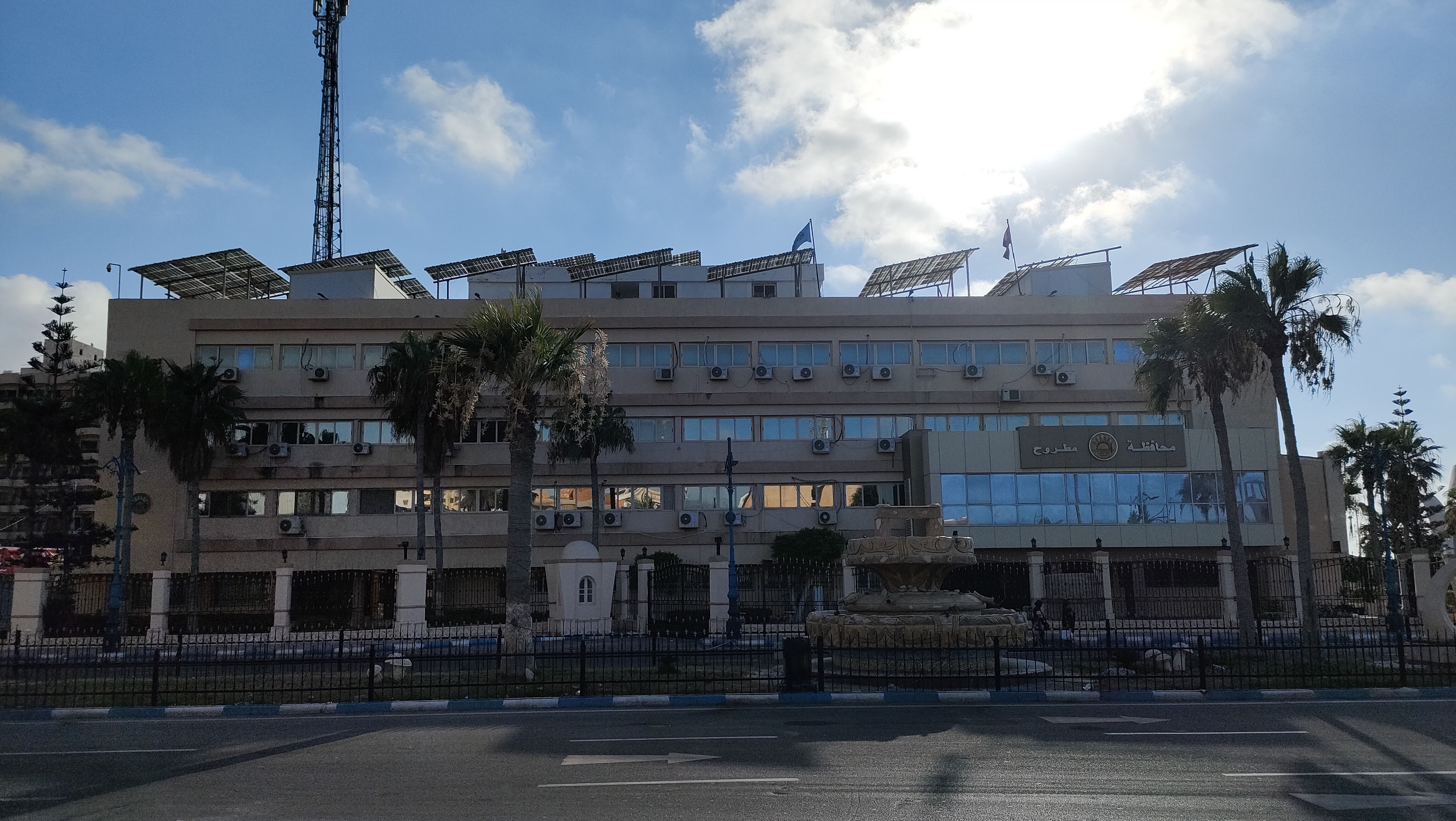

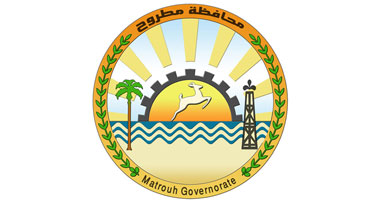
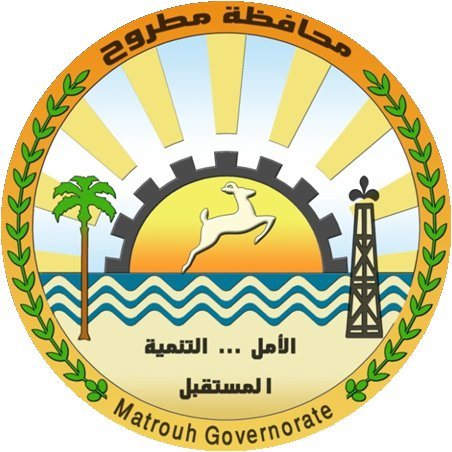
- Flag

- Matrouh Governorate on the map of Egypt
- Coordinates: 29.66°N 27.51°E
- Country: Egypt
- Seat: Mersa Matruh (capital)

Government
  - Governor: Khaled Shuaib Hussein

Area
  - Total: 212,112 km^{2} (81,897 sq mi)

Population (January 2023)
  - Total: 538,546
  - Density: 2.53897/km^{2} (6.57590/sq mi)

GDP
  - Total: EGP 116 billion (US$ 7.4 billion)
- Time zone: UTC+2 (EET)
  - Summer (DST): UTC+3 (EEST)
- HDI (2021): 0.738 high · 10th
- Website: www.matrouh.gov.eg

Matrouh (Arabic: محافظة مطروح, romanized: Muḥāfaẓat Maṭrūḥ) is a governorate in northwestern Egypt. It borders Libya, New Valley Governorate, Giza Governorate, Alexandria Governorate, Beheira Governorate and the Mediterranean Sea. Its capital is Marsa Matrouh.

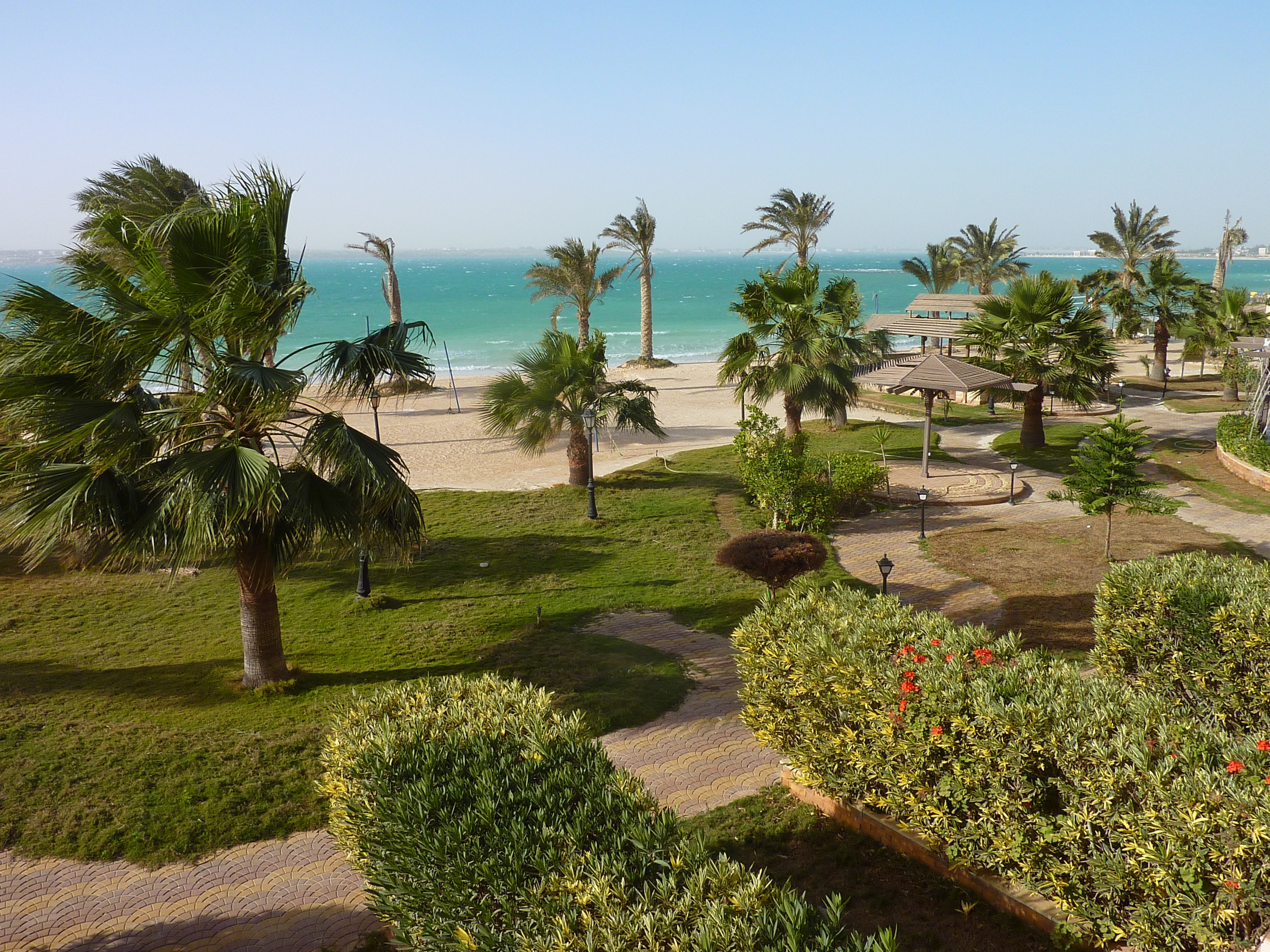
Matruh Governorate

== Municipal divisions ==
The governorate is divided into municipal divisions with a total estimated population as of January 2023 of 538,546.

Municipal Divisions
| Anglicised name | Native name | Arabic transliteration | Population (January 2023 Est.) | Type |
|---|---|---|---|---|
| El Dabaa | قسم الضبعة | Aḍ-Ḍab'ah | 61,363 | Kism (urban and rural parts) |
| El Alamein | قسم العلمين | Al-'Alamayn | 12,398 | Kism (fully rural) |
| El Hamam | قسم الحمام | Al-Ḥammām | 65,780 | Kism (urban and rural parts) |
| El Negaila | قسم النجيله | An-Najīlah | 34,593 | Kism (urban and rural parts) |
| North Coast | قسم الساحل الشمالى-جزء | As-Sāḥal ash-Shamāli | 88 | Kism (fully urban) |
| Sallum | قسم السلوم | As-Sallūm | 20,479 | Kism (urban and rural parts) |
| Mersa Matrouh | قسم مرسى مطروح | Marsá Maṭrūḥ | 241,625 | Kism (urban and rural parts) |
| Sidi Barrani | قسم سيدى برانى | Sīdī Barrānī | 66,319 | Kism (urban and rural parts) |
| Siwa Oasis | قسم سيوة | Sīwa | 35,901 | Kism (urban and rural parts) |

== Overview ==
The interior of the Matrouh Governorate is part of Egypt's Western Desert, including the Siwa Oasis, in antiquity known for its shrine to Amun. In the centre of the Governorate is the Qattara Depression, descending to 133 metres below sea level.

Marsa Matrouh is the ancient Koine Greek: Παραιτόνιον Paraitónion, Latin Paraetonium. It was the westernmost city of the Ptolemaic Kingdom in the Hellenistic period. The city of Apis, some 18 km to the west of Paraetonium, marked the boundary to Libycus nome, and the Halfaya Pass (at Sallum) marked the boundary to Marmarica proper.

Matrouh Governorate contains many historical sites related to World War II. The latter include el Alamein, which comprises cemeteries of fallen soldiers from Axis and Allied forces. An estimated 16 million mines, planted by the Europeans during the world wars and called "devil's gardens", still hinder the development of most of the governorate, and are constantly being removed.

== Population ==
According to population estimates, in 2015 the majority of residents in the governorate lived in urban areas, with an urbanisation rate of 70.6%. Out of an estimated 447,846 people residing in the governorate, 316,005 people lived in urban areas as opposed to only 131,841 in rural areas.

== Industrial zone ==
According to the Governing Authority for Investment and Free Zones (GAFI), the following industrial zones are located in Matrouh:

Zone name
26 Kilo Industrial Zone, South-East Matrouh Road
