= Narrative of a Ten Years' Residence at Tripoli in Africa =

Narrative of a Ten Years' Residence at Tripoli: From the Original Correspondence in the Possession of the Family of the Late Richard Tully is a work of travel literature based on personal experience in Ottoman Tripolitania, first published in England in 1816. The work was written by a certain 'Miss Dornbush' (fl. 1783—1795), given in the first edition as the sister, and in the second and third editions as the sister-in-law, of Richard Tully (born 1750; fl. 1768–1800), sometime British consul at Tripoli.

== Plague ==
The Narrative contains many particulars respecting the plague visited Tripoli during the author's stay there. Half of the Jewish population of the town, nearly half of the Moors, and a still larger proportion of the indigent part of the Christians, full victims to the pestilence. Recoveries took place in certain cases, when the tumours were opened by a lancet; but this expedient was deemed efficacious only when the violence of the disorder was past.

== Sources ==
- Colbert, Benjamin (12 January 2018). "Dornbush (Miss), fl. 1783—1795". British Travel Writing. University of Wolverhampton.
- "Narrative of a Residence in Tripoli". The Bath Chronicle. 19 November 1818. p. 2.
