= Sylvester Carmel Magro =

His Excellency Sylvester Carmel Magro O.F.M.
- Apostolic Vicar Emeritus of Benghazi
- Church: Roman Catholic
- See: Benghazi
- Appointed: 10 March 1997
- In office: 1997–2016
- Predecessor: Giustino Giulio Pastorino
- Other post: Titular Bishop of Saldae

Orders
- Ordination: 26 March 1966
- Consecration: 11 May 1997 by José Sebastián Laboa Gallego
- Rank: Bishop

Personal details
- Born: 14 February 1941 Rabat, Malta
- Died: January 20, 2018 (aged 76) Msida, Malta

Sylvester Carmel Magro (14 February 1941 – 20 January 2018) was a Maltese bishop who served as the Apostolic Vicar of Benghazi in Libya from 1997 until 2016.

Magro was born in Rabat, Malta, on 14 February 1941. In 1957 he joined the Franciscan order and was ordained a priest nine years later on 26 March 1966. In 1982 Magro became the parish priest of Sliema in Malta. In 1991 he became responsible for the Maltese and English-speaking communities in Libya. In 1997 Pope John Paul II appointed him as the Apostolic Vicar of Benghazi. He was ordained bishop by the Apostolic Nuncio to Malta, Archbishop José Sebastián Laboa Gallego. He was assisted by Joseph Mercieca the Archbishop of Malta and Giovanni Innocenzo Martinelli the Apostolic Vicar of Tripoli. During the Libyan Civil War Bishop Magro was repeatedly told to flee the country for his own safety, however he still remained with the people of Libya even in the midst of the difficult times. He was also warned repeatedly to flee Benghazi due to the area's instability. On the occasion of Bishop Magro's 75th birthday, 14 February 2016, Pope Francis accepted his resignation and appointed Monsignor George Bugeja OFM, then coadjutor bishop of Tripoli, as his successor.

Magro spent his last days in the Domus Pacis Franciscan Retirement Friary in Baħar iċ-Ċagħaq, Malta. He died on 20 January 2018, in Mater Dei Hospital in Msida, Malta. His Requiem Mass was celebrated in the St. Paul's Cathedral, Mdina, by Archbishop of Malta Charles Scicluna.
