= Protestantism in Libya =

Protestants make up less than 1% of the population of Libya.

The government limited the number of places of worship allowed for each Christian denomination to one per city. It is prohibited to proselytize Muslims and religious literature and websites are restricted. In 2022, the MV Logos Hope was refused permission to make port calls as local Islamic organizations believed that the mission of the ship was Christian proselytism. There are peaceful relations between Christians and Muslims; however, there are reports of government harassment of Christians who had converted from Islam.

There is a congregation of Anglicans in Tripoli; this is mainly composed of African immigrants. The church is part of the Anglican Diocese of Egypt.

In 2021 a governmental committee decided to return the church building used by the Union Church of Tripoli to the descendants of the original owners. The Union church made an agreement with the new owners to buy the building.

The Bible is available in Standard Arabic; however it is not yet available in Libyan Arabic.

HCJB radio broadcasts across Libya.

== Denominations ==
- Baptist Church in Tripoli
- Coptic Evangelical Church
- Seventh-day Adventist Church
- Union Church of Tripoli
- Tripoli Bible Church

Source of the list: The World Christian Encyclopedia, Second edition, Volume 1, p. 457

== Pentecostal worship in Libya ==
There are Protestant worship groups in cities including Tripoli and Misrata. Several of these churches are primarily worship groups who gather together every Friday and are led by Pentecostal pastors. Although these worship places are not officially approved by the government, these groups assemble together without any problems. The following churches are known places of Pentecostal worship:

- Indian Prayer Fellowship, Tripoli
- Global Faith Fellowship, Misrata.

== See also ==
- Religion in Libya
- Christianity in Libya
- Catholic Church in Libya
- Copts in Libya
- Protestantism by country
