= Religion in Libya =

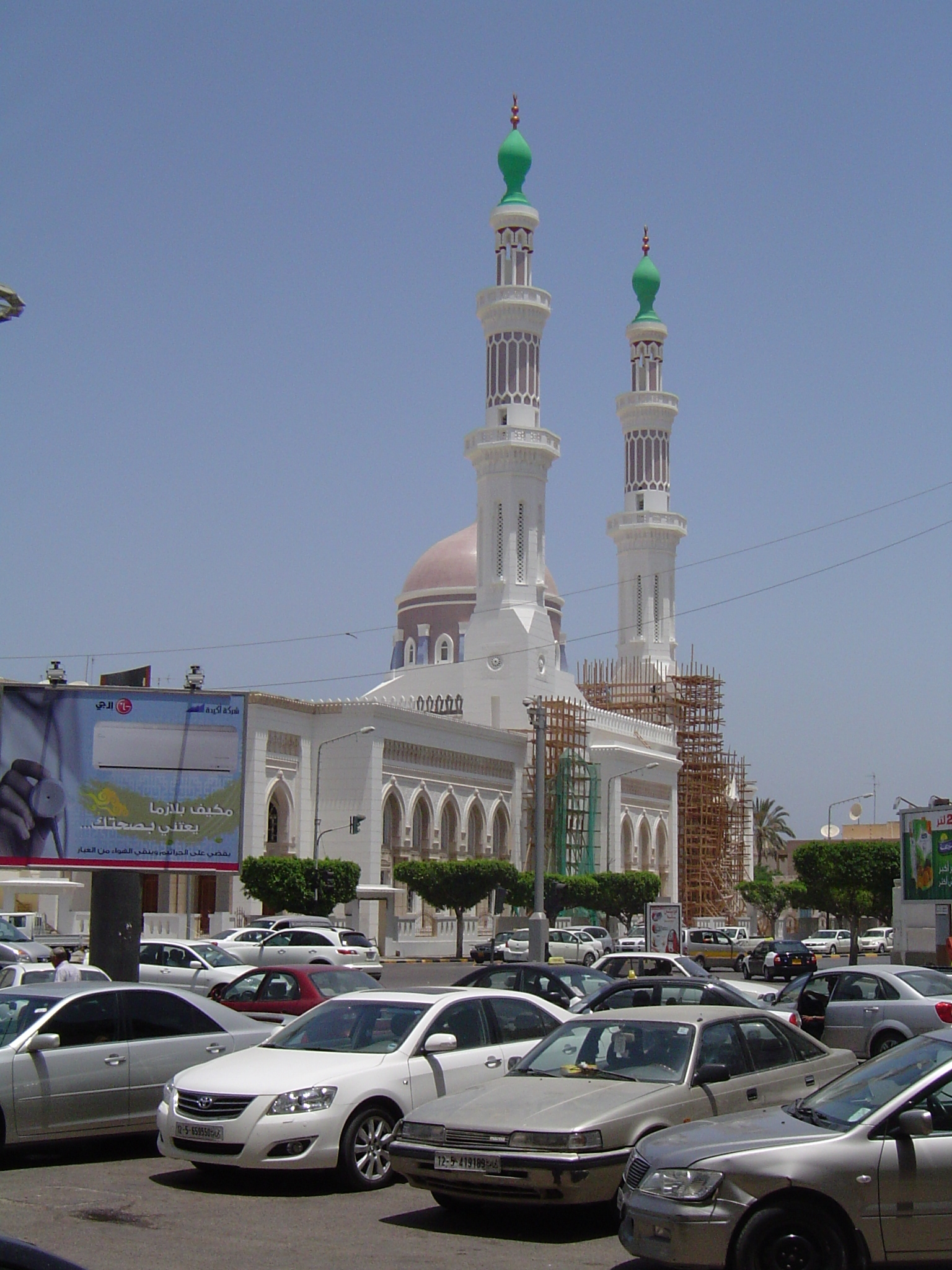
Worshipers gather at Mawlai Muhammad Mosque, Tripoli.

Religion in Libya in 2020
1. Sunni Islam (94.2%)
2. non-Sunni Islam (4.78%)
3. Christianity (0.52%)
4. Buddhism (0.26%)
5. Other (0.18%)
6. No religion (0.05%)
Religion in Libya in 2011
1. Islam (96.6%)
2. Christianity (2.70%)
3. Buddhism (0.30%)
4. Other (0.40%)

Islam is the dominant religion in Libya.

Other than the vast majority of Sunni Muslims, there are also small Christian communities, composed exclusively of immigrants. Coptic Orthodox Christianity, which is the Christian Church of Egypt, is the largest and most historical Christian denomination in Libya.

In 2016, there were over 60,000 Egyptian Copts in Libya, as they comprise over 1% of the population alone. There were an estimated 40,000 Roman Catholics in Libya who are served by two Bishops, one in Tripoli (serving the Italian community) and one in Benghazi (serving the Maltese community). There was also a small Anglican community, made up mostly of African immigrant workers in Tripoli; it is part of the Anglican Diocese of Egypt.

Libya was until recent times the home of one of the oldest Jewish communities in the world, dating back to at least 300 BC. A series of pogroms beginning in November 1945 lasted for almost three years, drastically reducing Libya's Jewish population.

== Religious freedom ==
=== Religious liberties ===
The Libyan constitution states that Islam is the state religion and that Sharia is the primary source of legislation. However, under sharia law, freedom of religion is guaranteed to Christians and Jews (including the right to govern familial matters such as divorce and inheritance) and discrimination on the basis of religion is prohibited. Religious minorities other than Christians and Jews are not granted the same religious freedom under Libyan law. Regarding conversion from one religion to another, there is no protection of the right to do so or explicit prohibition of conversion away from Islam or proselytizing, however missionary work and conversion are effectively prohibited. Libyan law prohibits insulting Islam and the Islamic prophet Muhammad, as well as publications that aim to "change the fundamental principles of the constitution or the fundamental rules of the social structure." These laws are used to deter missionary work as well as the circulation of non-Islamic religious materials.

=== Religiously motivated violence ===
The rights of religious minorities provided by Libyan law are often violated and religiously motivated violence is common. Religious minorities can face intense pressure to convert or revert to Islam, especially in areas controlled by Salafist militant groups. Non-Muslims face heightened risk of violence (including sexual assault) in refugee detention centers and one Christian refugee reported that the guards treated refugees from Morocco, a Muslim-majority country, better. The SDF (Special Deterrent Force), a Salafist armed group previously affiliated with the GNA, have reportedly arrested several people accused of violating Islamic law.

In 2023, Libya was ranked as the 5th worst country to be a Christian.

In the same year, the country was scored 1 out of 4 for religious freedom.

== Islam ==
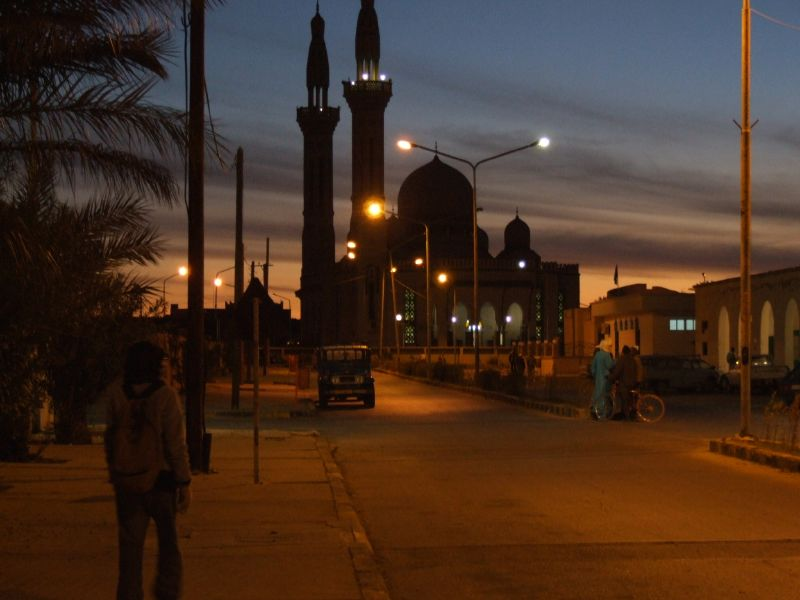
Mosque in Ghadames, close to the Tunisian and Algerian border. About 97% of Libyans are followers of Islam.

During the seventh century, Muslim conquerors reached Libya, and by the eighth century most of the resistance mounted by the indigenous Berbers had ended. The urban centers soon became substantially Islamic, but widespread conversion didn't happen until later.

A residue of pre-Islamic beliefs blended with the pure Islam of the Arabs. Hence, popular Islam became an overlay of Qur'anic ritual and principles upon the vestiges of earlier beliefs - prevalent throughout North Africa - in jinns (spirits), the evil eye, rites to ensure good fortune, and cult veneration of local saints. The educated of the cities and towns served as the primary bearers and guardians of the more austere brand of orthodox Islam.

Before the 1930s, the Sanusi Movement was the primary Islamic movement in Libya. This was a religious revival adapted to desert life. Its zawaayaa (lodges) were found in Tripolitania and Fezzan, but Sanusi influence was strongest in Cyrenaica. Rescuing the region from unrest was very conservative and somewhat different from the Islam that exists in Libya today. A Libyan form of Sufism is also common in parts of the country.

== Christianity ==
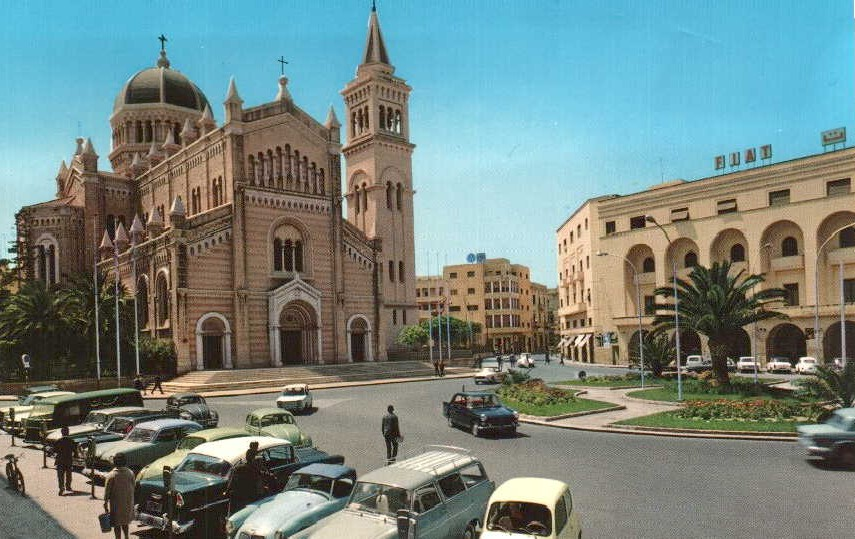
The Cathedral of Tripoli in the 1960s.

Christianity is a minority religion in Libya. The largest Christian group in Libya is the Coptic Orthodox made up entirely of Egyptian immigrant workers, with a population of over 60,000 people in 2016. The Coptic (Egyptian) Church is known to have several historical roots in Libya long before the Arabs advanced westward from Egypt into Libya. However, the Roman Catholics had a large number as well, with 40,000 members. There is one Anglican congregation in Tripoli, made up mostly of African immigrant workers in Tripoli and which belongs to the Egyptian Anglican diocese. The Anglican bishop of Libya has his see in Cairo, as most Christians in Libya originate from Egypt, including the Copts.

According to Open Doors' World Watch List 2026, Libya is ranked #9 in the world for the persecution of Christians because of the lack of religious freedom and frequent violence against Christians.

A 2015 study estimate some 1,500 Christians from a Muslim background living in the country.

== Judaism ==
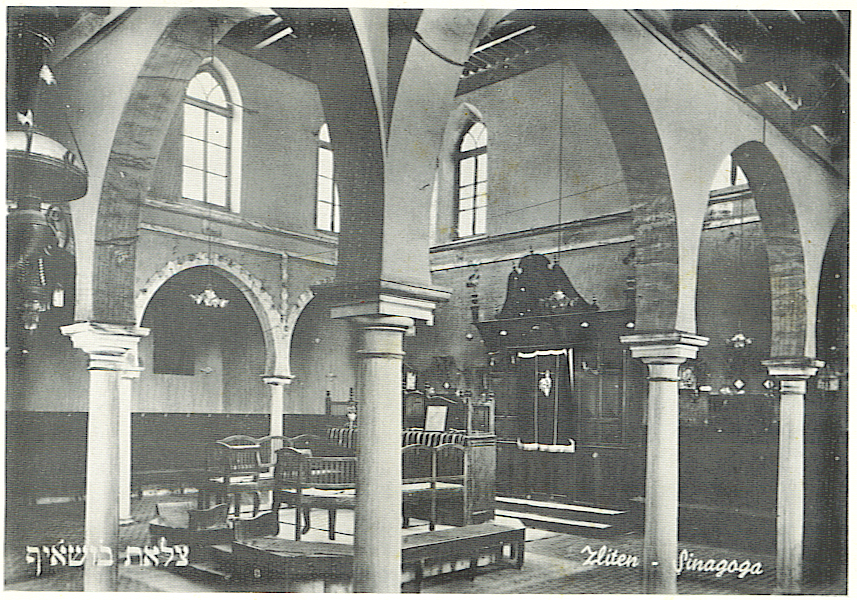
The Slat Abn Shaif Synagogue in Zliten before World War II

Jews had a presence in Libya at least since the time of Hellenistic rule under Ptolemy Lagos in 323 BC in Cyrene. Once home to a very large and thriving Jewish community, Libya is now completely empty of Jews due to anti-Jewish pogroms and immigration to Israel.

During World War II, Libya's Jewish population was subjected to anti-Semitic laws by the Fascist Italian regime and deportations by German troops. After the war, anti-Jewish violence caused many Jews to leave the country usually for Palestine. A savage pogrom in Tripoli on 5 November 1945, killed more than 140 Jews and wounded hundreds more. Almost every synagogue was looted. In June 1948, when there was a recorded 38,000 Jews in Libya, rioters murdered another 12 Jews and destroyed 280 Jewish homes.

Thousands of Jews fled the country after Libya was granted independence and membership in the Arab League in 1951. After the Six-Day War, the Jewish population of 7,000 was again subjected to pogroms in which 18 were killed, and many more injured, sparking a near-total exodus that left fewer than 100 Jews in Libya.

Under former ruler Colonel Muammar Gaddafi, the situation became a lot worse, as all Jewish property was confiscated and all debts to Jews cancelled. In 1999, the synagogue in Tripoli was renovated, however, it was not reopened.

The last Jew living in Libya, Esmeralda Meghnagi, died in February 2002. This marked the end of one of the world's oldest Jewish communities, which traced its origins to the 4th century BC.

== Religiosity ==
According to a survey by Arab Barometer, the percentage of Libyans identifying themselves as non-religious increased from around 10% in 2013 to around 25% in 2018. In the survey, about a third of the young Libyans described themselves as not religious. According to the same Arab Barometer Survey in 2018, 99.9% in Libya identified as Muslim, while 0.1% identified as having No Religion. This survey was based on a sample size of 1,962 people in Libya.

== Buddhism ==
With 0.3% of its population identifying as Buddhist, Libya has the largest proportion of Buddhists of any North African country. Many Buddhists are immigrants from Asia. However, there are no Buddhist pagodas or temples in Libya.

== Hinduism ==
There are very few Hindus in Libya. They mainly traveled from India to work in Libya. Around 15-16 thousand Hindus resided until 2011. But when war broke out, many returned to India.

== See also ==
- Demographics of Libya
- Christianity in Libya
- Catholic Church in Libya
- Protestantism in Libya
