= Misrata (disambiguation) =

Misrata is the capital city of Misrata District, Libya

Mis(u)rata may also refer to:

- Misrata District, district in northwestern Libya
- Misrata Governorate, former governorate of Libya from 1963 to 1983
- Apostolic Prefecture of Misurata, the Roman Catholic missionary jurisdiction which has its see there
