= Antipyrgos (titular see) =

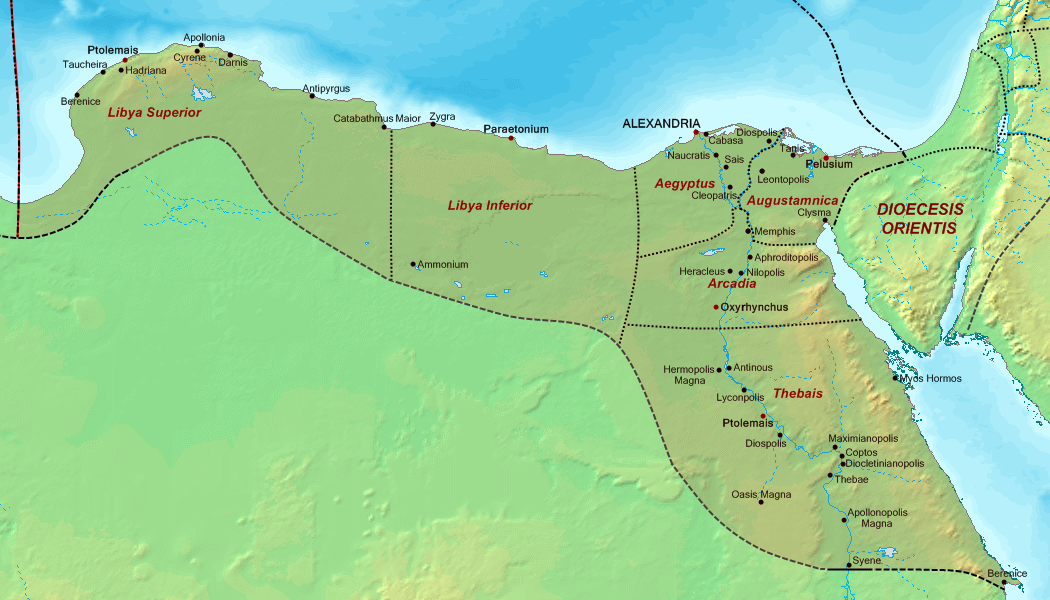
Map of the Diocese of Egypt in antiquity

The diocese of Antipirgo (Latin: Dioecesis Antipyrgensis) is a suppressed and titular see of the Roman Catholic Church. The Roman town of Antipirgo, is identifiable with Tobruch in today's Libya, but during the Roman Empire it was in the Roman province of Creta and Cyrene and then in late antiquity Libya Inferior (Marmarica), and the bishopric was suffragan to the archdiocese of Darnis.

Of this ancient diocese only one bishop, Emiliano, is known; he was among the bishops who attended the Second Council of Constantinople in 553. Today Antipirgo survives as a titular bishopric, and the seat is vacant since March 6, 1969.

== Known Bishops ==
- Emiliano (fl.553)
- Luigi Ermenegildo Ricci, (1922–1931)
- John Chang Pi-te (1932–1946)
- Riccardo Ramos de Castro Vilela (1946–1958)
- Wilhelm Tuschen (1958–1961)
- Myles McKeon (1962–1969)
