= El Hamam =

El Hamam الحمام
- Town
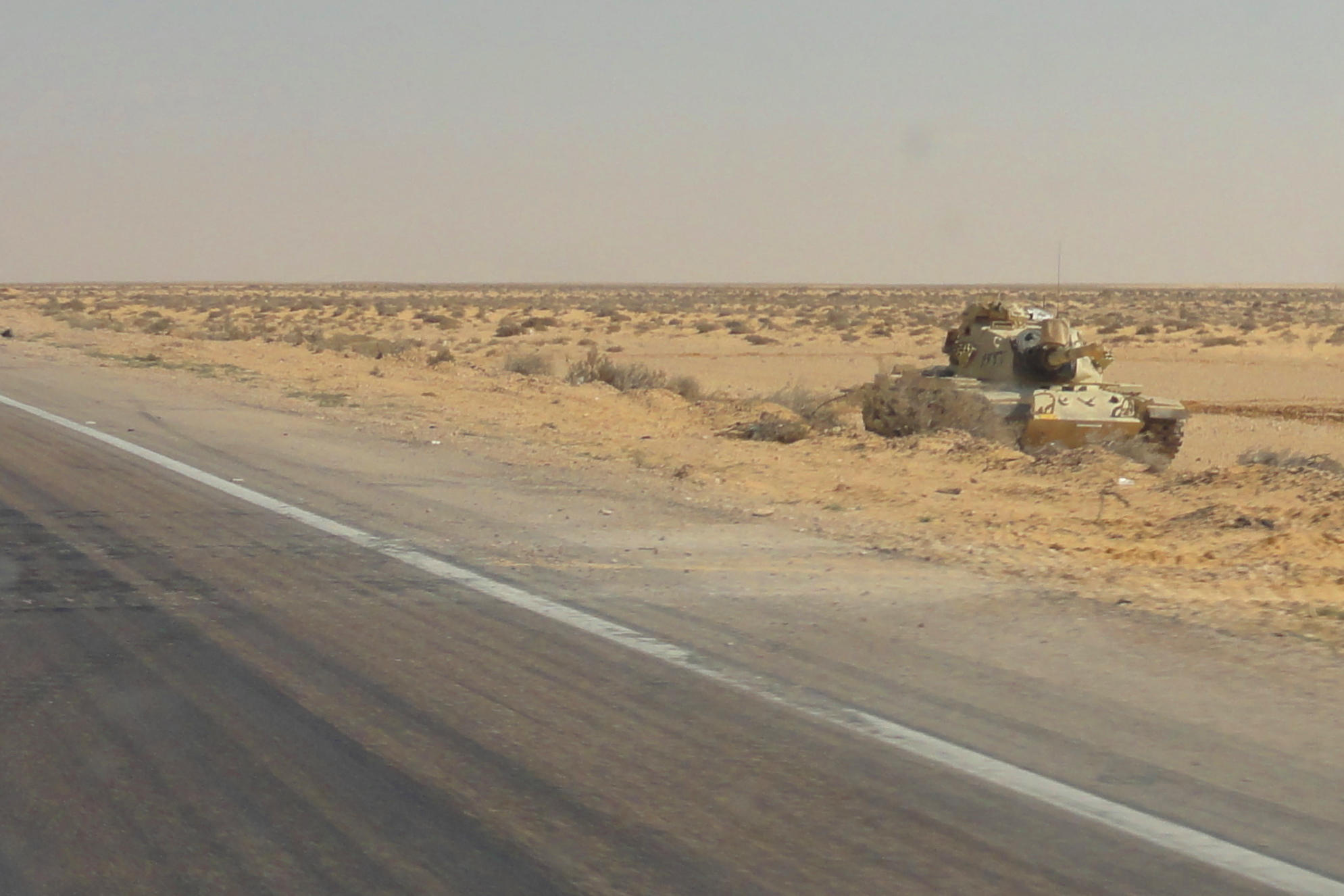
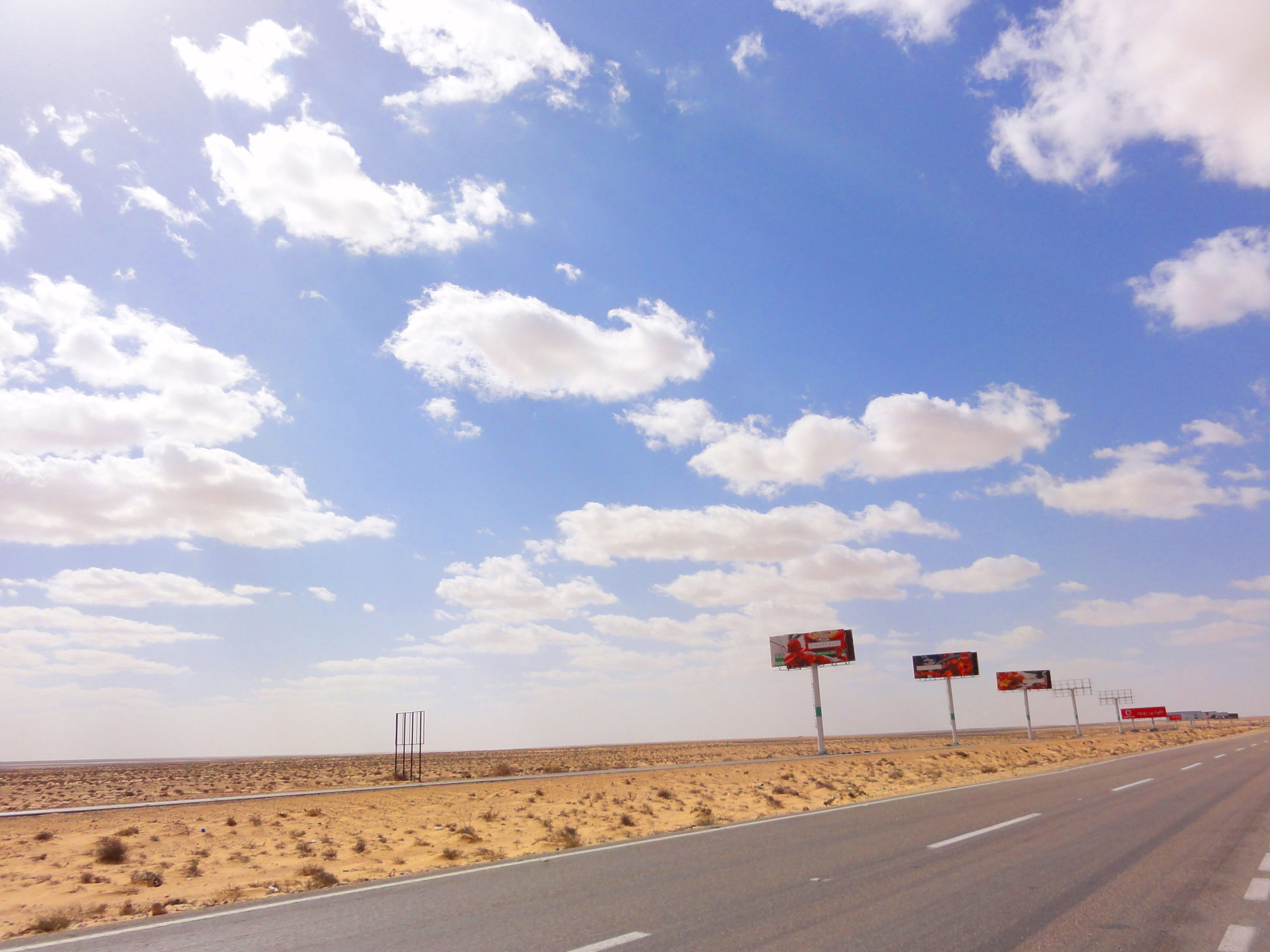
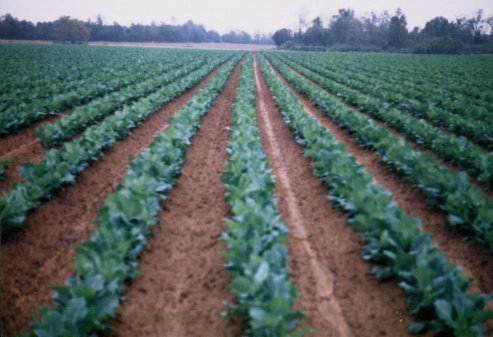
- Panoramas of El Hamam

- Location in Egypt
- Coordinates: 30.841852°N 29.394043°E
- Country: Egypt
- Governorate: Matrouh

Area
  - Total: 33.1 km^{2} (12.8 sq mi)

Population (2023)
  - Total: 20,156
  - Density: 609/km^{2} (1,580/sq mi)
- Demonym(s): Hamami (Male, Arabic: حمامي) Hamamiyah (Female, Arabic: حمامية)
- Time zone: UTC+2 (EET)
  - Summer (DST): UTC+3 (EEST)

El Hamam (Arabic: الحمام) is the easternmost city in the Matrouh Governorate, Egypt, located on the Mediterranean coast close to the border with the Alexandria Governorate.

The ancient town Cheimo (Greek: Χειμὼ or Χιμὼ) was located in city's vicinity. The ancient Greek author of the Stadiasmus Maris Magni states that Cheimo was a town where rocky shoals were visible.

It is also home to the Mohamed Naguib Military Base, which replaced an older military base constructed in 1993.
