= Zagylis =

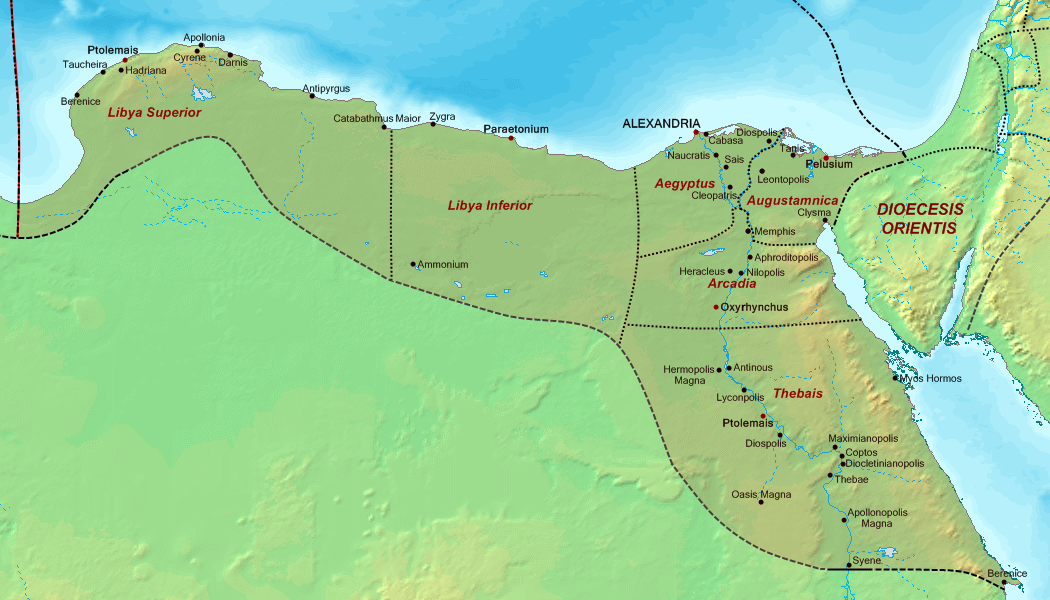
Map of the Diocese of Egypt in antiquity

The Diocese of Zagylis is the titular diocese of the Roman Catholic Church, established in 1933 by Pope Pius XI, named after the ancient city of Zagylis in present-day Libya.

This city was in the Roman province of Libya Inferior. Since the foundation, the diocese had no titular bishop.

The diocese re-establishes an ancient bishopric that flourished in the Roman Empire. Three bishops from antiquity are known.

1. Filocalo (fl.449)
2. Massimo (fl.457)
3. Giovanni (fl.480 circa)
