= St. Francis Pro-Cathedral, Tripoli =

Catholic church in Tripoli, Libya

St. Francis Pro-Cathedral
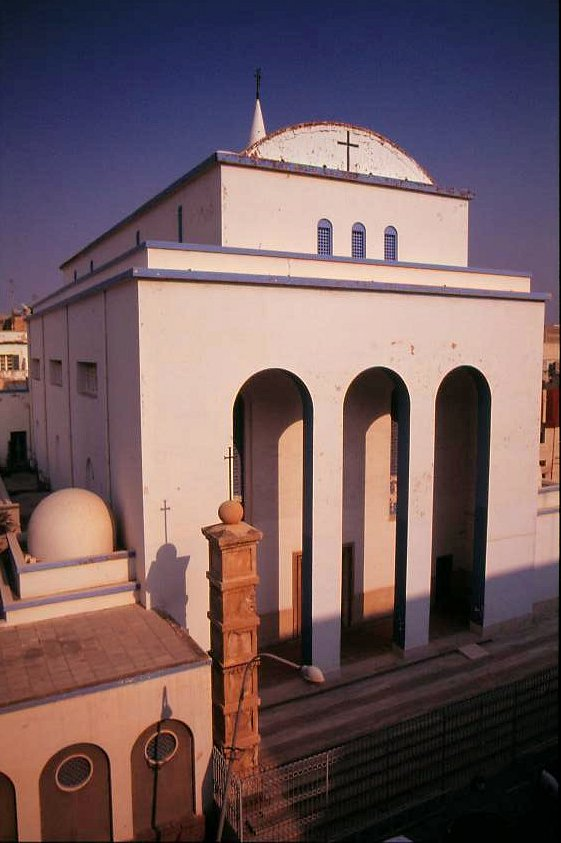
- St. Francis Pro-Cathedral
- St. Francis Pro-Cathedral
- Location: Tripoli, Libya
- Denomination: Catholic Church
- Religious order: Order of Friars Minor

History
- Status: Pro-Cathedral

Architecture
- Functional status: Active
- Architectural type: Church architecture
- Completed: c. 1643

Administration
- Province: Apostolic Vicariate of Tripoli

The St. Francis Pro-Cathedral or simply Church of St. Francis, is a Roman Catholic church located in the city of Tripoli, Libya.

== Cathedral ==
The St. Francis Pro-Cathedral serves as a parish church and the pro-cathedral or temporary cathedral of the Latin Church Apostolic Vicariate of Tripoli (Vicariatus Apostolicus Tripolitanus) which was created in 1630 by Pope Urban VIII.

It is located approximately 740 m (2,430 ft) from the former Tripoli Cathedral, completed in 1928, which was converted into a mosque in c. 1970s. The pro-cathedral is run by the Franciscans of the Province of St. Paul the Apostle (Malta) with the church of Mary Immaculate in Benghazi.

== See also ==
- Roman Catholicism in Libya
- Pro-Cathedral
