= Diocese of Antiphrae =

Roman Catholic titular see

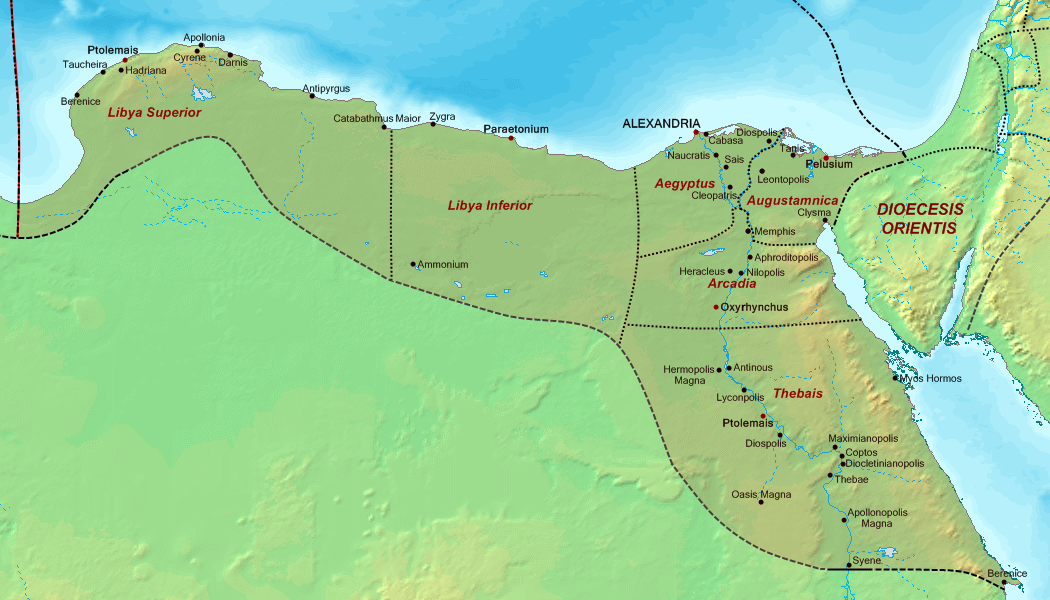
Map of the Diocese of Egypt in antiquity

The Diocese of Antiphrae (Latin: Dioecesis Antiphrensis) is a Roman Catholic titular see and was an ancient diocese.

The diocese was centered on the Roman civitas (town) of Antiphrae, which has been tentatively identified with Marina El Alamein near Dresieh. The ancient bishopric was first in the Roman province of Crete and Cyrene, then in late antiquity, Libya inferior (Marmarica), suffraged by the archdiocese of Darni.

Of this ancient diocese there are only three bishops known. Serapione took part in the first Council of Nicea in 325. Menas attended the council of Alexandria convened by Patriarch Sant'Atanasio in 362. Apollo signed the letter of the bishops of Egypt to Emperor Leo (458) following the killing of the Alexandrian patriarch Proterius; and also subscribed to the decree of Genadius of Constantinople against the simons in 459.

Today Antifre survives as a bishopric holder; the seat is vacant since September 15, 1965.

== Known bishops ==
- Serapione (fl. 325)
- Menas (fl. 362)
- Apollo (fl.458–459)
- Louis-Marie-Henri-Joseph Bigolet (1911–1923)
- Louis-Nestor Renault (1924–1943)
- Pietro Ermenegildo Focaccia (1944–1946)
- André Sorin (1946–1959)
- John Joseph Maguire (1959–1965)
