= Menelai Portus =

Ancient Greek city with a port in Africa, between Cyrene and Egypt

Menelai Portus or Menelaus Portus or Port of Menelaus (Ancient Greek: Μενελάϊος λίμην), also called Menelaita, was an ancient city with a port on the coast of Marmarica in Northern Africa between Cyrene and Egypt. It was founded, according to tradition, by Menelaus. It was known as the site of the death of Agesilaus II in his march from the Nile to Cyrene.

Its position must be sought on the coast of the Wady Daphnéh, near the Râs-al-Milhr.
