= Apostolic Vicariate of Tripoli =

Latin Catholic missionary jurisdiction in Libya

Apostolic Vicariate of Tripoli Vicariatus Apostolicus Tripolitanus
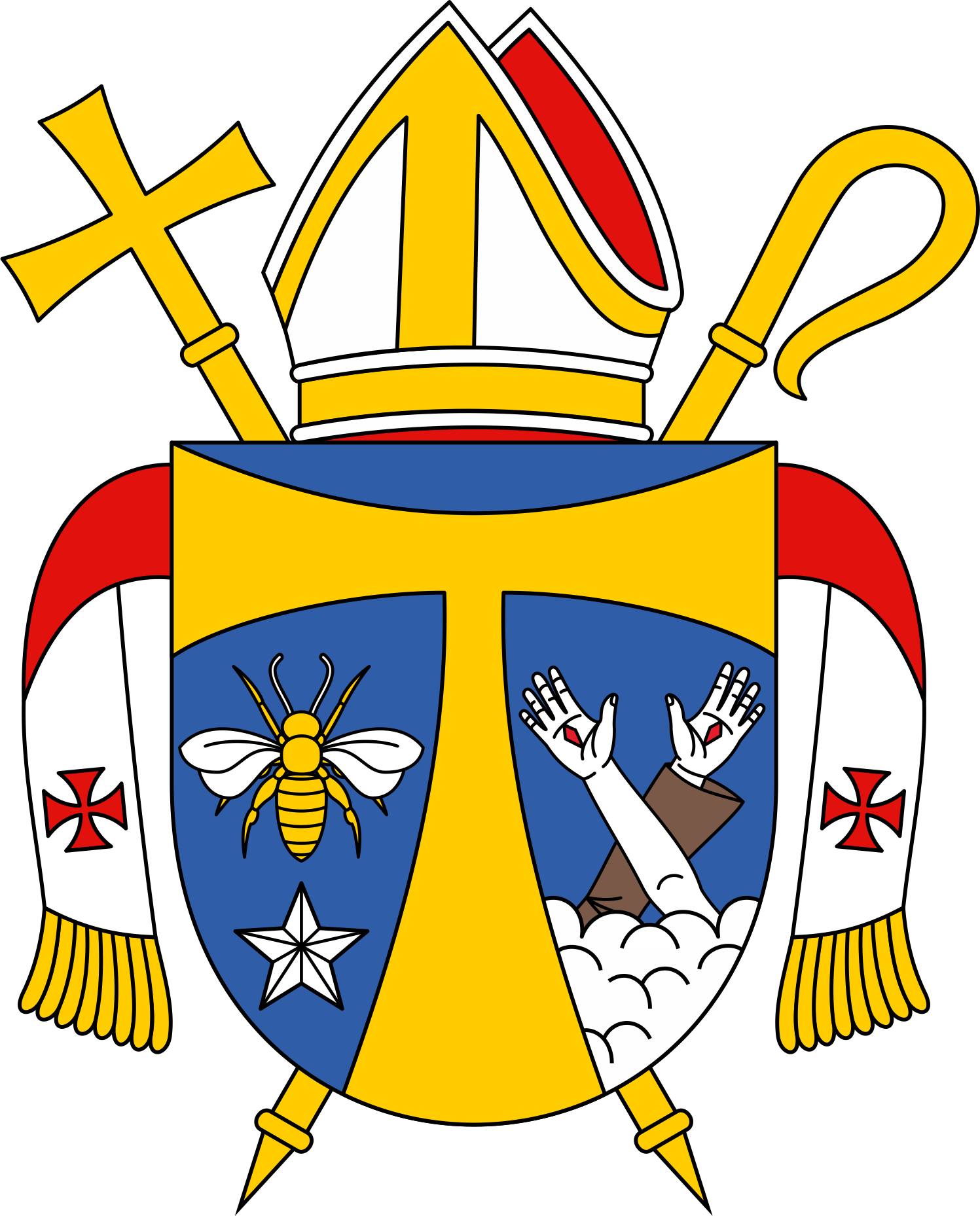

Location
- Country: Libya
- Metropolitan: Immediately exempt to the Holy See

Statistics
- Area: 1,150,000 km^{2} (440,000 sq mi)
- Population: Total; Catholics: (as of 2004); 4,500,000; 3.000 (1.6%)

Information
- Denomination: Catholic Church
- Sui iuris church: Latin Church
- Rite: Roman Rite
- Apostolic Administrator: Magdi Helmy Ibrahim Mansour, O.F.M.
- Bishops emeritus: George Bugeja, O.F.M.

The Apostolic Vicariate of Tripoli (Latin: Vicariatus Apostolicus Tripolitanus) is a Latin Church missionary territory or apostolic vicariate of the Catholic Church in Tripolitania, Libya.

It is immediately exempt to the Holy See, depending on the Roman Congregation for the Evangelization of Peoples, and not part of any ecclesiastical province

Although still named after its episcopal see, it has no cathedral since Tripoli Cathedral was converted into a mosque. Currently the temporary cathedral is the St. Francis Pro-Cathedral located in the city of Tripoli that simultaneously serves as a parish church.

== History ==
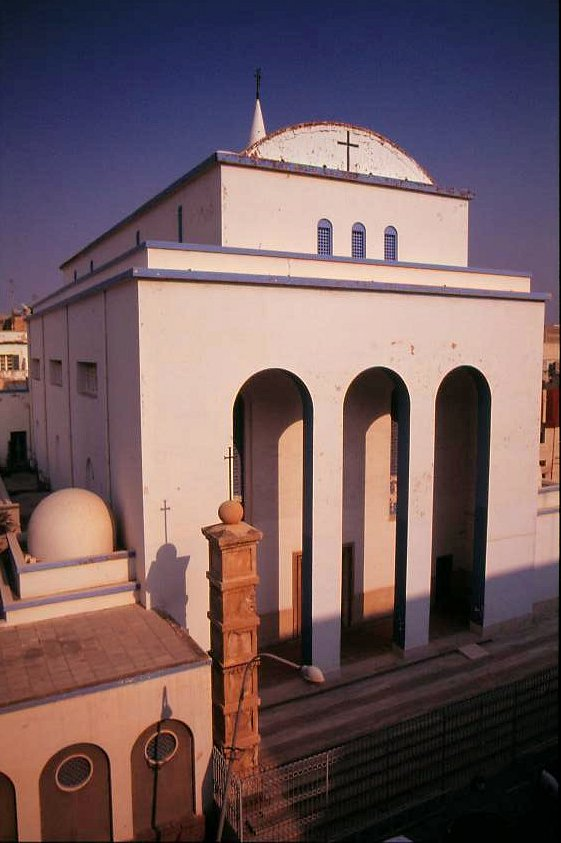
Pro-cathedral of St. Francis in Tripoli

- Established in 1630 as Apostolic Prefecture of Tripoli, on territory canonically split off from the Spanish Diocese of Islas Canarias.
- Promoted and renamed in 1894 as Apostolic Vicariate of Libya, hence entitled to a titular bishop.
- Renamed on February 3, 1927 as Apostolic Vicariate of Tripolitana, having lost territory to establish the Apostolic Vicariate of Cyrenaica (later renamed Benghazi, after its see).
- June 22, 1939: Renamed as Apostolic Vicariate of Tripoli, having lost more Libyan territory to establish the Apostolic Prefecture of Misurata.

== Statistics ==
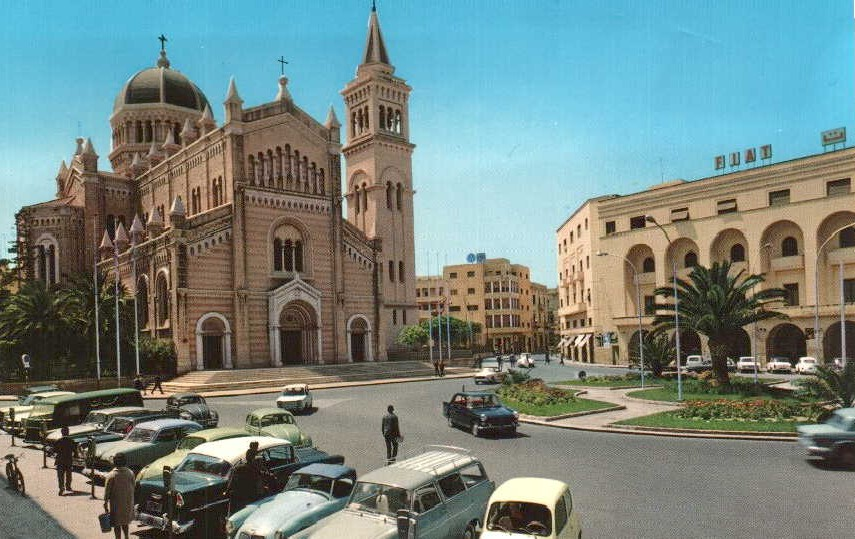
Tripoli Cathedral before conversion into a mosque

As of 2014, it pastorally served 50,000 Catholics (0.8% of 6,204,000 total) on 1,000,000 km² in one cathedral parish and 15 missions with 5 priests (1 diocesan, 4 religious), and 18 lay religious (6 brothers, 12 sisters).

== Ordinaries ==
All members of the Friars Minor, O.F.M.

=== Apostolic Prefects of Tripoli ===
- Friar Pascal Canto, OFM (1643–?)
- Pietro Tognoletto da Palermo, OFM (?–?)
- Girolamo da Castelvetrano, OFM (1675–?)
- Maurizio da Lucca, OFM (1691–1698)
- Giovanni Francesco da Varese, OFM (1698 – 7 July 1700)
- Nicolò da Chio, OFM (17 August 1700 – February 1707)
- Francesco Maria da Sarzana, OFM (1707 – 9 April 1713)
- Pietro da Castelfranco, OFM (21 August 1713 – 1719?)
- Gian Andrea da Vignolo, OFM (1719?–?)
- Bernardino da Lucca, OFM (1746–1748)
- Benvenuto da Rose, OFM (?–1783)
- Clemente da Montalboldo, OFM (1783–1788?)
- Candido di Genova, OFM (?–?)
- Gaudenzio da Trento, OFM (1790?–1795)
- Pacifico da Monte Cassiano, OFM (1800?–?)
- Benedetto da San Donato, OFM (?–1824)
- Filippo da Coltibuono, OFM (?–1832)
- Venanzio da San Venanzio, OFM (1843–?)
- Ludovico da Modena, OFM (?–1843)
- Angelo Maria da Sant'Agata, OFM (?–1869)

=== Apostolic Vicars of Libya ===
- Carlo da Borgo Giovi, O.F.M (?–1899)
- Giuseppe Bevilacqua da Barrafranca, O.F.M (?–1904)
- Bonaventura Rossetti, O.F.M (August 1907 – ?)
- Ludovico Antomelli, O.F.M (23 February 1913 – 10 March 1919), appointed Bishop of Bagnoregio (Bagnorea), Italy
- Giacinto Tonizza, O.F.M (7 August 1919 – 3 February 1927 see below)

=== Apostolic Vicar of Tripolitania ===
- Giacinto Tonizza, O.F.M (see above 3 February 1927 – 16 April 1935)

=== Apostolic Vicars of Tripoli ===
- Camillo Vittorino Facchinetti, O.F.M (9 March 1936 – 25 December 1950)
- Vitale Bonifacio Bertoli, O.F.M (5 April 1951 – 10 March 1967)
- Guido Attilio Previtali, O.F.M (26 June 1969 – 3 May 1985), resigned
- Giovanni Innocenzo Martinelli, O.F.M (3 May 1985 – 5 February 2017), retired
- George Bugeja, O.F.M (5 February 2017 – 22 October 2025), resigned
  - Apostolic Administrator Magdi Helmy Ibrahim Mansour, O.F.M. (22 October 2025 – Present)

== Sources and external links ==
- GCatholic.org, with incumbent biographical links, Google map and - satellite photo
- Catholic Hierarchy [self-published]
