= Marmarica =

Littoral region of ancient Libya

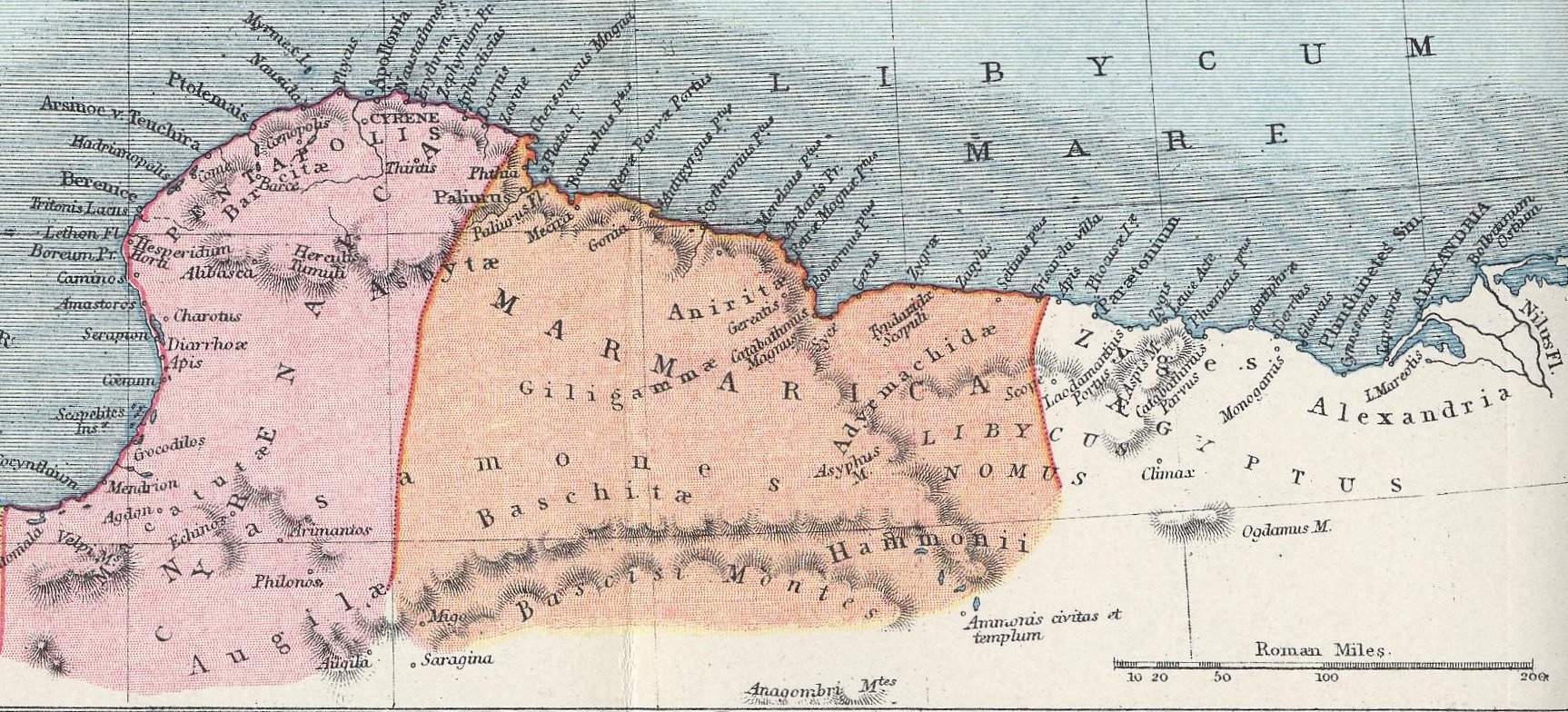
Map of Cyrenaica and Marmarica in the Roman era (Samuel Butler, 1907)

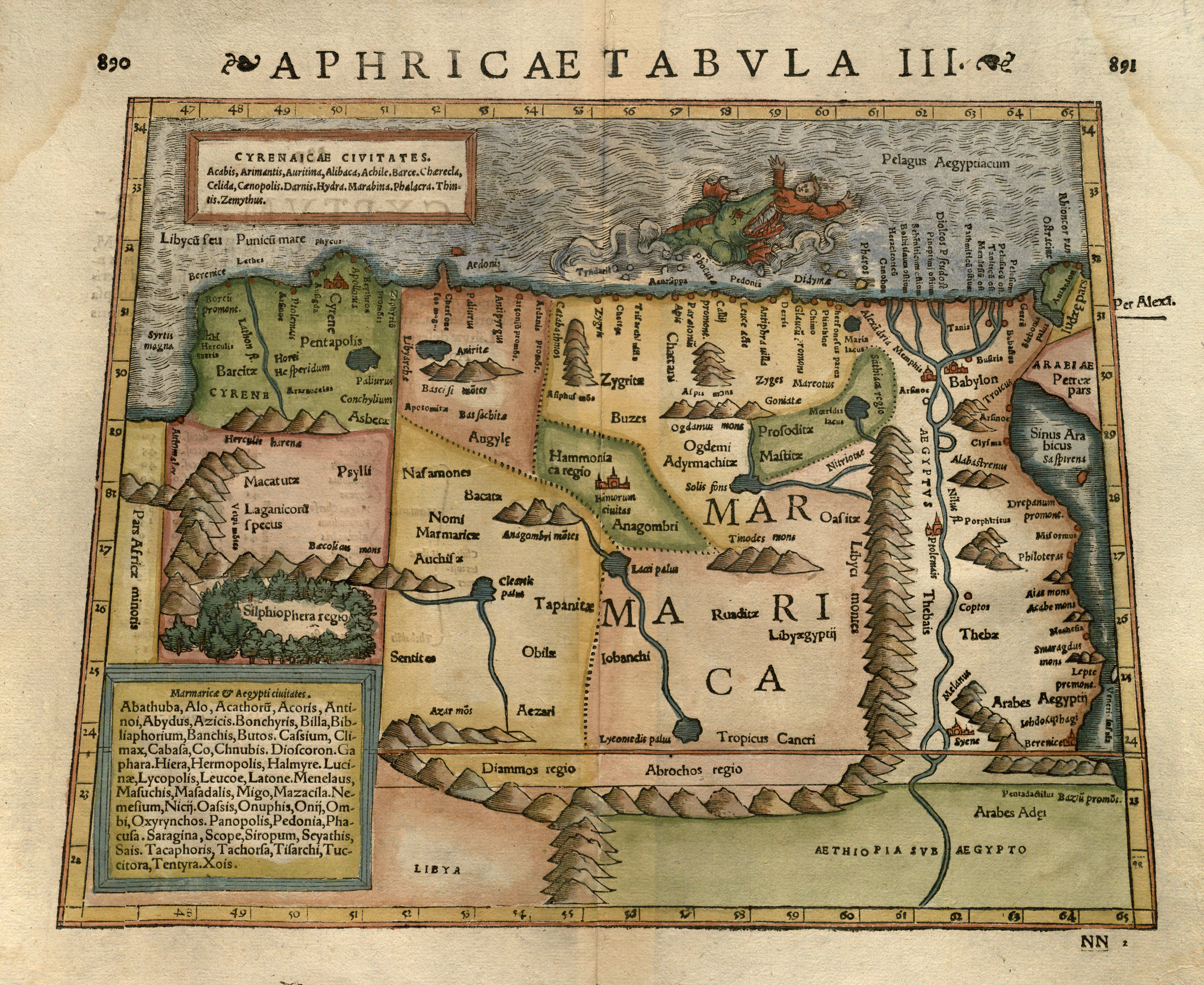
Sebastian Münster's Aphricae Tabula III, depicting Marmarica in 1540

Marmarica (Ancient Greek: Μαρμαρική, Arabic: مَرَاقِيَّة, romanized: Marāqiyyah) in ancient geography was a littoral area in Ancient Libya, located between Cyrenaica and Aegyptus. It corresponds to what is now the Libya and Egypt frontier, including the towns of Bomba (ancient Phthia), Timimi (ancient Paliurus), Tobruk (ancient Antipyrgus), Acroma (ancient Gonia), Bardiya, As-Salum, and Sidi Barrani (ancient Zygra). The territory stretched to the far south, encompassing the Siwa Oasis, which at the time was known for its sanctuary to the deity Amun. The eastern part of Marmarica, by some geographers considered a separate district between Marmarica and Aegyptus, was known as Libycus Nomus. In late antiquity, Marmarica was also known as Libya Inferior, while Cyrenaica was known as Libya Superior.

Libya is found in Africa and is located west of the Nile, more precisely west of the mouth of the Nile at Canopus. The Periplus of Pseudo-Scylax names the Adyrmachidae as the first people of Libya (Africa). Marmarica proper was delimited towards the east by the escarpment of Catabathmus Magnus, now known as Akabah el-Kebir, at Salum.

Under the Roman Empire, Marmarica included the Libycus Nomus, located between the Catabathmus and the Bay of Plinthine (Sinus Plinthinetes). This area had formerly been considered part of Egypt. The city of Paraetonium (also Ammonia, modern Mersa Matruh) was the westernmost town of Egypt, for which reason it together with Pelusium was known as the "horns of Egypt". About 10 stadia west of Paraetonium was Apis, marking the border to the Libyan Nomos. Menelaus Portus (near modern Zawiyat Umm Rukbah), according to tradition founded by Menelaus, was known as the site of the death of Agesilaus II.

The inhabitants of Marmarica were known generically as Marmaridae (Μαρμαρίδαι), but they are given the special names of Adyrmachidae (Ἀδυρμαχίδαι) and Giligammae (Γιλιγάμμαι and Γιλιγάμβαι) in the coastal districts, and of Nasamones (Νασαμῶνες) and Augilae (Αὔγιλαι and Αὐγιλίται) in the interior. The Adyrmachidae are said to have differed considerably from the nomadic tribes of the country, strongly resembling the Egyptians. The territory south of the Libyan Nomos was inhabited by the Ammonii (Ἀμμώνιοι), centered on the celebrated and fertile oasis of Ammon (Siwa)

Both Cyrenaica and Marmarica were included in the diocese of Egypt in the 4th century, within the larger Praetorian prefecture of the East (while Tripolitania was in the Praetorian prefecture of Italy).

== Episcopal sees ==
Ancient episcopal sees of the Roman province of Marmarica or Libya Inferior listed in the Annuario Pontificio as titular sees:

- Ammoniace
- Antiphrae (near Dresiyeh)
- Antipyrgos
- Darnis
- Zagylis
- Zygris

For the sees of Libya Superior see Cyrenaica.

== See also ==
- North Africa during Antiquity
- Butnan District
- Matrouh Governorate
- Libyan Desert
