= Diocese of Ammoniace =

Roman Catholic titular see

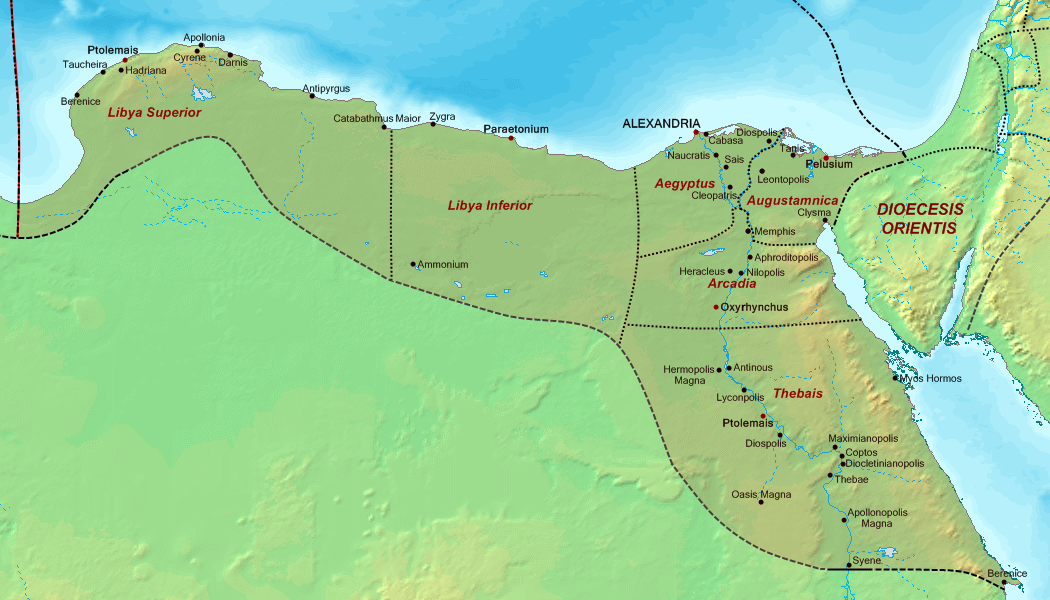
Map of the Diocese of Egypt in antiquity

The diocese of Ammonia (Latin: Dioecesis Ammoniacensis) is a suppressed and titular see of the Roman Catholic Church. It is all that remains of the ancient bishopric that was centered the Siwa Oasis during late antiquity, when it was in the Roman province of Marmarica and suffraged by the archdiocese of Darni. Today Ammoniace survives as a titular bishopric and has been vacant since January 24, 1983.
