= Giovanni Innocenzo Martinelli =

Libyan-Italian Roman Catholic prelate (1942–2019)

Giovanni Innocenzo Martinelli OFM
- Apostolic Vicar of Tripoli
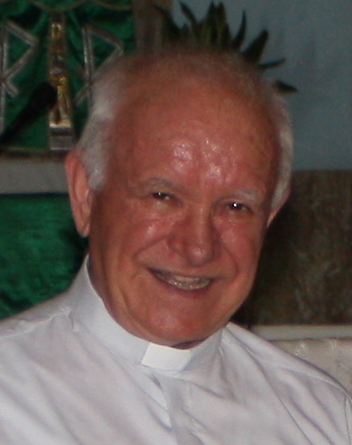
- Martinelli in 2009
- Church: Catholic Church
- See: Apostolic Vicariate of Tripoli
- In office: 3 May 1985 – 5 February 2017
- Predecessor: Guido Attilio Previtali
- Successor: George Bugeja
- Previous post: Titular Bishop of Tabuda (1985-2019)

Orders
- Ordination: 28 July 1967
- Consecration: 4 October 1985 by Gabriel Montalvo Higuera

Personal details
- Born: 5 February 1942 Al Khadra, Derna Province, Libya, Italian Empire
- Died: 30 December 2019 (aged 77) Saccolongo, Veneto, Italy

Giovanni Innocenzo Martinelli OFM (5 February 1942 in El Khadra, Libya – 30 December 2019 in Saccolongo, Italy) was an Italian Roman Catholic prelate. He was also a Vicar Apostolic of Tripoli and the Titular Bishop of Tabuda.

== Life ==
Martinelli was born in Italian Libya, but moved to Italy with his family when he was a child. He was ordained as a Roman Catholic priest in 1967 and returned to Libya in 1971.

In 1985, he was appointed the Vicar Apostolic of Tripoli and the Titular Bishop of Tabuda.

During the civil war in Libya he made an appeal, unheeded by the western states, not to humiliate Gaddafi, but to seek dialogue with him. Martinelli was one of the few who understood that without Gaddafi, Libya would be in threat of a civil war.

He then strongly condemned the NATO bombings during the 2011 military intervention in Libya.

In February 2015, during the Libyan crisis for the control of the provinces of Barqa and Tripoli by ISIS, Martinelli refused to leave the country and was the last Italian left in that territory. He received death threats, but he declared to be ready for martyrdom if necessary and remained one of the last 300 Catholics in Libya.

He had severe health problems and had to retire to Italy; he left Libya on 22 October 2015. He then presented his resignation to Pope Francis on 5 February 2017, his 75th birthday. Pope Francis accepted his renunciation and coadiutor Bishop George Bugeja, who was already in Tripoli before Martinelli's departure in 2015, took over. His health slowly continued to deteriorate and he was taken care of in the elderly care center of the Friars Minor of Saccolongo, where he died on 30 December 2019.

== See also ==
- Catholic Church in Libya
- Italian Libya

Catholic Church titles
Vacant Title last held by James Louis Flaherty	— TITULAR — Bishop of Tabuda; 3 May 1985 – 31 December 2019	Vacant
Preceded by Guido Attilio Previtali	Vicar Apostolic of Tripoli; 3 May 1985 – 5 February 2017	Succeeded by George Bugeja
