= Copts in Libya =

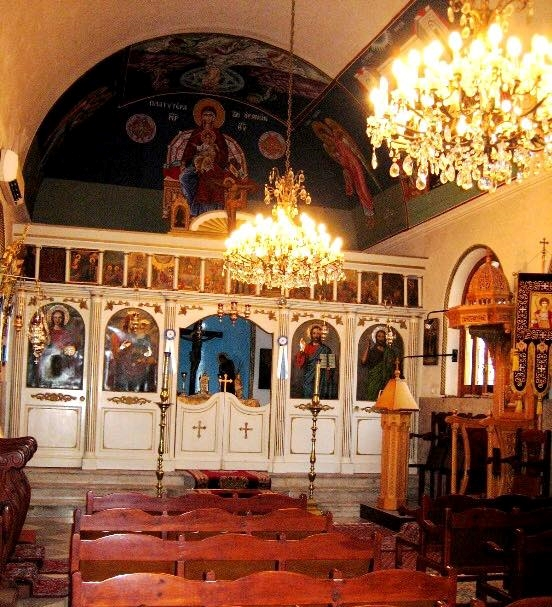
- Orthodox church in Tripoli

Total population
- 60,000

Regions with significant populations
- Tripoli, Sirte, Benghazi, Bayda

Languages
- Libyan Arabic; Liturgical: Coptic language

Religion
- Coptic Orthodoxy

Copts in Libya may refer to people born in or residing in Libya of full or partial Coptic origin. Coptic people are an ethnoreligious group that form the largest Christian group in Libya, the Coptic Orthodox Church in the country having an estimated 60,000 adherents. The Coptic Church is known to have historical roots in Libya long before the Arabs (and Islam) advanced westward from Egypt into Libya. A part of the community is made up of immigrants from Egypt (see Copts in Egypt).

== Population ==
The Coptic population is estimated to number 60,000. The Copts are the largest Christian denomination, followed by c. 40,000 Roman Catholics and a small number of Anglicans. They are present in all three major regions.

== History ==
=== Early history ===
Historically speaking, Christianity spread to the Pentapolis in North Africa from Egypt; Synesius of Cyrene , bishop of Ptolemais, received his instruction at Alexandria in both the Catechetical School and the Museion, and he had a great deal of reverence and affection for Neoplatonist Hypatia, whose classes he had attended. Synesius was consecrated by Theophilus of Alexandria in 410. Since the Council of Nicaea in 325, Cyrenaica had been recognized as an ecclesiastical province of the See of Alexandria, in accordance with the ruling of the Nicaean Fathers. The Pope of Alexandria to this day includes the Pentapolis in his title as an area within his jurisdiction.

The Coptic congregations in several countries were under the ancient Eparchy of the Western Pentapolis, which was part of the Coptic Orthodox Church for centuries until the 13th century.

=== Modern ===
In 1971 Pope Shenouda III reinstated it as part of the Eparchy of Metropolitan Bishop Pachomius, Metropolitan of the Holy Metropolis of Beheira (Thmuis & Hermopolis Parva), (Buto), Mariout (Mareotis), Marsa Matruh (Paraetonium), (Apis), Patriarchal Exarch of the Ancient Metropolis of Libya: (Livis, Marmarica, Darnis & Tripolitania) & Titular Metropolitan Archbishop of the Great and Ancient Metropolis of Pentapolis: (Cyren), (Appollonia), (Ptolemais), (Berenice) and (Arsinoe).

This was one among a chain of many restructuring of several eparchies by Pope Shenouda III, while some of them were incorporated into the jurisdiction of others, especially those who were within an uncovered region or which were part of a Metropolis that became extinct, or by dividing large eparchies into smaller more manageable eparchies. This was also a part of the restructuring of the Church as a whole.

== Churches ==
There are three Coptic Orthodox Churches in Libya: one in Tripoli, Libya (Saint Mark's), one in Benghazi, Libya (Saint Antonios - two priests), and one in Misrata, Libya (Saint Mary and Saint George).

== Persecution ==
In February 2014, seven Coptic Christians were dragged out of their houses in the middle of the night, then murdered on a beach, east of Benghazi. A group of Copts were kidnapped on separate occasions in December 2014 and January 2015, then murdered by the Islamic State of Iraq and the Levant. A video of the killing of 21 men, in which threats are made to "the nation of the cross", was released to the internet on 15 February 2015.

== See also ==
- Coptic diaspora
- Christianity in Libya
- Copts in Egypt
- Copts in Sudan
- 21 Martyrs in Libya

== Sources ==
- Morgan, Jason; Falola, Toyin; Oyeniyi, Bukola Adeyemi (2012). Culture and Customs of Libya. ABC-CLIO. ISBN 978-0-313-37860-7.
- Thomas C. Oden (2 December 2011). Early Libyan Christianity: Uncovering a North African Tradition. InterVarsity Press. pp. 21-. ISBN 978-0-8308-6954-1.
- Richard George Goodchild (1976). Libyan studies: select papers of the late R. G. Goodchild. P. Elek. ISBN 978-0-236-17680-9.
- Goodchild, Richard G. (1967). "Byzantines, Berbers and Arabs in 7th-century Libya". Antiquity. 41 (162): 115–124. doi:10.1017/S0003598X00033044.
- Eljarh, Mohamed (2013). "Libya's Copts under attack?". Foreign Policy. 19.
- Cafiero, Giorgio (2013). "The plight of Christians in post-Gaddafi Libya: as it was under the dictatorship, continuing insecurity for a religious minority: North Africa-issue in focus". Africa Conflict Monthly Monitor: 30–33.
