= Apostolic Vicariate of Derna =

Latin Catholic missionary jurisdiction in Libya

Apostolic Vicariate of Derna Vicariatus Apostolicus Dernensis

Location
- Country: Libya
- Metropolitan: Immediately exempt to the Holy See
- Headquarters: Benghazi, Libya
- Coordinates: 32°45′59.8″N 22°38′13.2″E

Statistics
- Area: 120,000 km^{2} (46,000 sq mi)
- Population: Total; Catholics: (as of 1966); 100,000; 500 (0.5%)
- Parishes: 3

Information
- Denomination: Catholic Church
- Sui iuris church: Latin Church
- Rite: Roman Rite
- Established: 22 June 1939; 87 years ago
- Cathedral: episcopal see (no cathedral)
- Secular priests: 4 (all Religious Orders)

Current leadership
- Pope: Leo XIV
- Bishop: Sede vacante
- Apostolic Administrator: Sandro Overend Rigillo, O.F.M.

The Apostolic Vicariate of Derna (Latin: Vicariatus Apostolicus Dernensis) is a Latin Church missionary territory or apostolic vicariate of the Catholic Church in Derna, Libya. It has an episcopal see, but no cathedral.

The apostolic vicariate is exempt to the Holy See (specifically the Congregation for the Evangelization of Peoples) and not part of any ecclesiastical province.

== History ==
- Established on 22 June 1939 as Apostolic Vicariate of Derna, on territory split from the Apostolic Vicariate of Cyrenaica.

== Episcopal ordinaries ==
Apostolic Vicars of Derna

- Giovanni Lucato, S.D.B. (13 September 1939 – 21 June 1948), appointed Bishop of Isernia e Venafro
  - Apostolic Administrator Giustino Pastorino, O.F.M. (1966 – 1978), Vicar Apostolic of Benghazi
  - Apostolic Administrator George Bugeja, O.F.M. (14 February 2016 – 8 December 2019), Vicar Apostolic of Tripoli
  - Apostolic Administrator Sandro Overend Rigillo, O.F.M. (8 December 2019 – Present), Vicar Apostolic of Benghazi

== See also ==
- Apostolic Prefecture of Misurata

== Source, References and External links ==
- GCatholic.org, with incumbent biography links
- Catholic Hierarchy
