= Tripoli Cathedral =

Former Roman Catholic church in Tripoli, Libya

Coordinates: 32°53′26″N 13°11′9″E

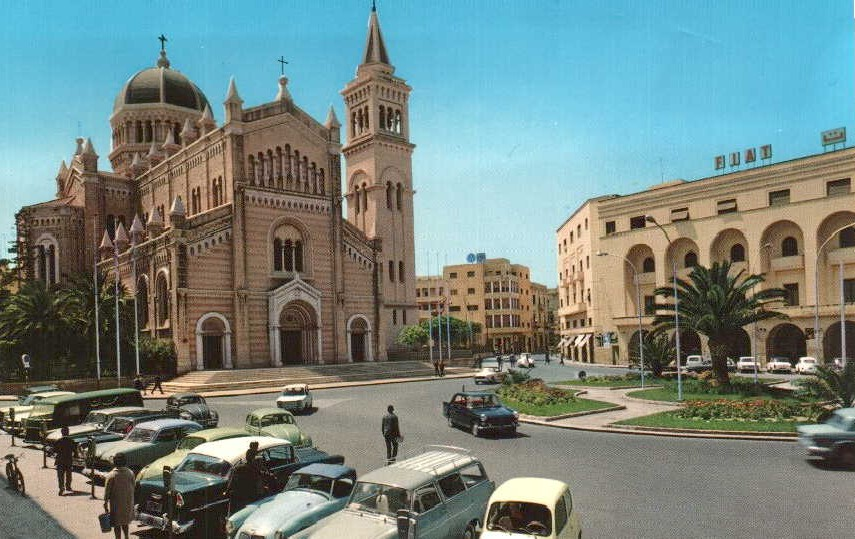
- The cathedral in the 1960s
- Tripoli Cathedral
- Location: Tripoli
- Country: Libya
- Denomination: Roman Catholic Church (former)
- Churchmanship: Latin Rite

History
- Status: Church (1928–1970s)

Architecture
- Functional status: Inactive; Repurposed as a mosque
- Architectural type: Church basilica
- Style: Romanesque Revival
- Groundbreaking: c. 1923
- Completed: 1928

The Tripoli Cathedral (Italian: La Cattedrale di Tripoli; Arabic: كاتدرائية طرابلس), is a former Roman Catholic cathedral located on what was called Piazza della Cattedrale in the city centre of Tripoli, the capital of Libya. Completed as a church in the 1920s during the Italian Libya colonial era, the building was repurposed as the Algeria Square Mosque in c. 1970, and the square renamed as Algeria/Elgazayer Square (Maidan al Jazair/Maydan elgazayer).

The St. Francis Pro-Cathedral has served as the temporary cathedral for the Apostolic Vicariate of Tripoli.

== History ==
=== As a church ===
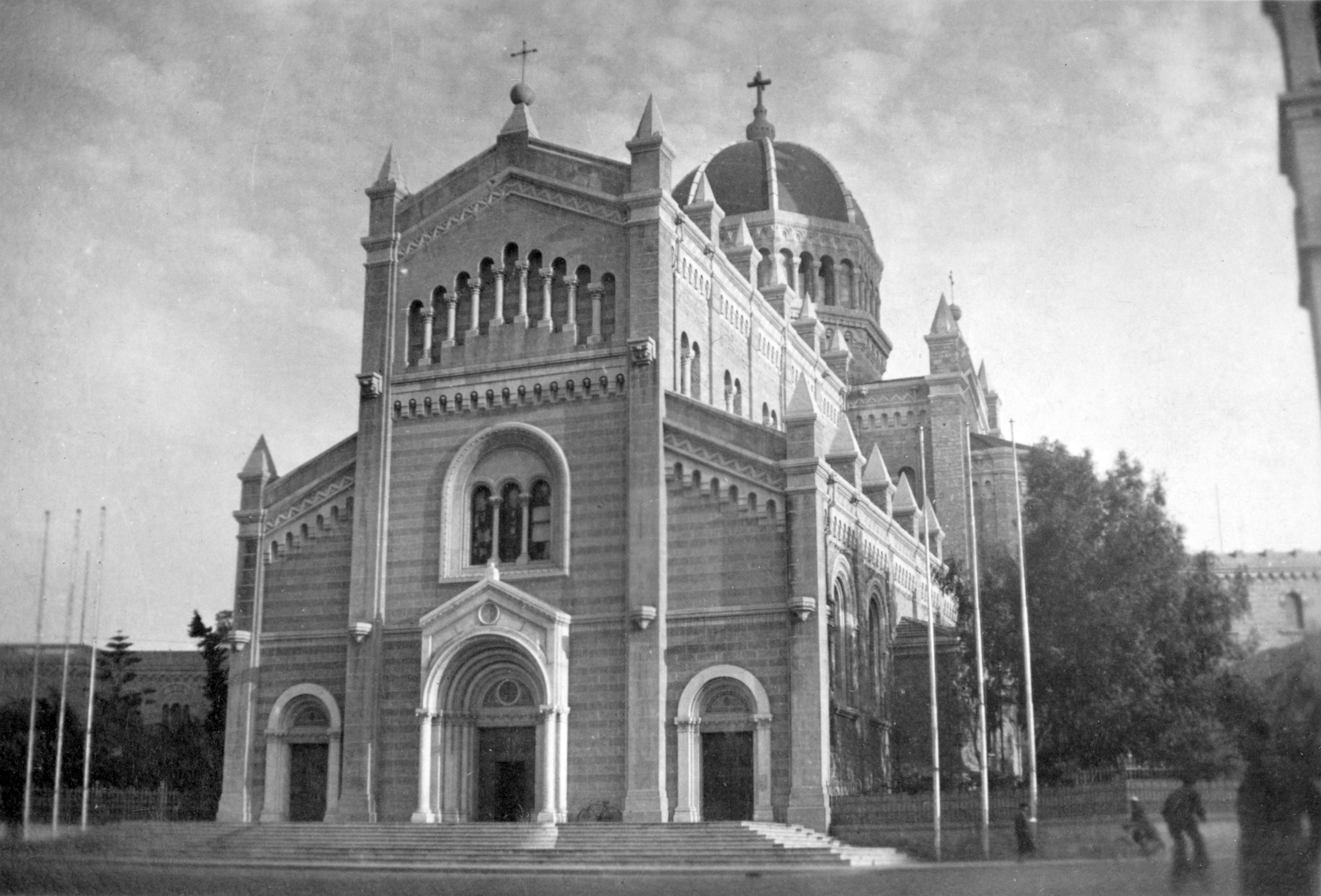
The cathedral in 1943

The Tripoli Cathedral was built c. 1923 and officially opened in 1928, albeit being partially complete; during the Italian Libya colonial era. The original architect was Saffo Panteri, who designed the Cathedral in Romanesque Revival style with a Basilica and cupola (dome) reaching the height of 46 m (151 ft), including a belltower (campanile) that was 60 m (200 ft) high and was decorated with renaissance Venetian style engravings and statuettes.

The cathedral was inaugurated and consecrated to Catholic worship on 24–26 November 1928 by the Apostolic Vicar of the Holy See in Tripolitania, Mons. Giacinto Tonizza. The solemn ceremony took place in the presence of the Governor Gen. Emilio De Bono and in presence with the highest civil authorities and military hierarchies from Libya's three major regions of Tripolitania, Cyrenaica and Fezzan since 1911.

In the year 1920, the Italian community in Tripoli realized that the settler population had grown to 25,000 people and a new Catholic Cathedral would be required. Following examples of Byzantine architecture from 4th and 5th centuries AD, the design would incorporate a central Basilica, following typical Roman architecture, and a bell tower, that would stand out for its size and height in the square towering most of the buildings in the city and most notably the striped facades and curved window arches typical of Byzantine-Roman architectures.

In January 1923, the founding grounds were selected, and the foundation stone of the cathedral was laid, and construction began. The area chosen for the construction of the cathedral was primarily selected for convenience within the center of the city where main roads converged and near to the Palazzo delle Poste (Post office plaza), adjacent to the then Tripolitania INPS headquarters, and the Corso Vittorio Emanuele III Road, with the old Palazzo del Municipio and the Palazzo delle Poste, connected to the roundabout of the Gazzelle fountain, facing the Lungomare Giuseppe Volpi road.

During its 5-year construction, the cathedral, along with other churches took part in yearly Epiphanies when possible, outside the cathedral. The construction of the cathedral was finalized by the end of December 1931 with the completion of a 60-meter bell tower and a 4.70-meter cross. A ceremony took place with the Epiphany of 1932 in Tripoli. The five bells produced by the Fratelli Barigozzi Foundry ( Barrigozzi Brothers) rang for the first time. Reportedly, two "business groups" undertook the responsibility of building the cathedral, namely, the "Awakening group" and the "Società Chini" (The Chini Society) according to Vittorio Sciuto, who has lived and studied the era. The Basilica, characterized by the Roman architecture and white facade stood out for its size and height in the square towering most of the buildings in the city, and truly resembled a marvel within Tripoli. One of the most notable events regarding the cathedral was the Eucharistic Congress of 24 November in 1937 of which celebrations took place in Tripoli, with a filming crew capturing the footage.

Tripoli Cathedral was the second Catholic church consecrated in the city, the first being Santa Maria degli Angeli, constructed by the Maltese community in 1870 which is still standing in the old city of Tripoli.

=== Conversion to a mosque ===
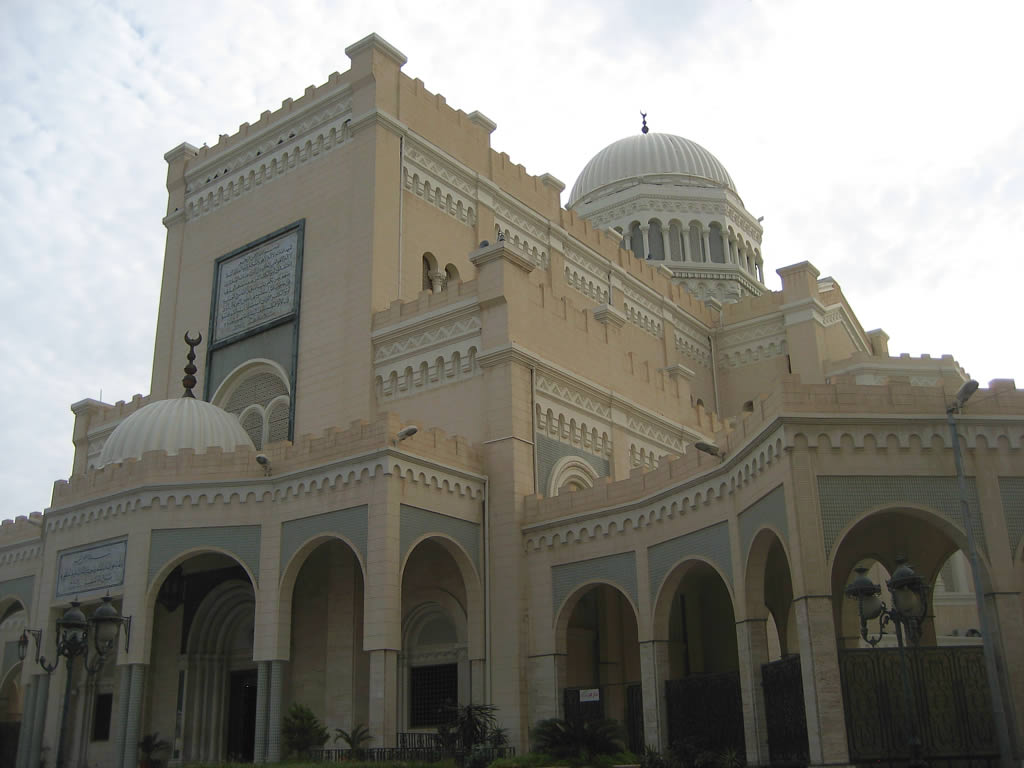
The mosque in 2010

In July 1970, after the rise to power of Muammar Gaddafi, the Revolutionary Council ordered the confiscation of all Italian and church property. In September of the same year, the Vicar Apostolic of Benghazi was expelled and the cathedral was closed.

The cathedral was subsequently transformed into a mosque, called the Gamal Abdel Nasser Mosque or Algeria Square Mosque. Due to the controversial nature of this information, and due to intentional Historical negationism by the Gaddafi regime and its unreliable sources, the official conversion may have begun later with certain parts of the cathedral changed, and then fully, and visibly completed on the exterior circa late 1990–2000. The cathedral was renamed "as Jamal Abdul Nasser Mosque" and is currently being used as a place of worship.

The former cathedral retains its overall shape, with the main Basilica and separate bell tower shape, but the facade of the building and the interior have undergone major changes.

As of 2020, the mosque is open to public and can be visited.

== See also ==
- Roman Catholicism in Libya
- Italian Libya
- St. Francis Pro-Cathedral, Tripoli
