= Apis (city) =

Ancient city in Northern Africa

Apis (Greek: Ἄπις, named for the god Apis), was an ancient seaport town (Polyb. Exc. Leg. 115) on the north coast of Africa, about 18 km west of Paraetonium, sometimes considered located within Egypt, and sometimes in Marmarica. Scylax (p. 44) places it at the western boundary of Egypt, on the frontier of the Marmaridae. Ptolemy (iv. 5. § 5) mentions it as in the Libyae Nomos; and so does Pliny the Elder, who calls it nobilis religione Aegypti locus (v. 6, where the common text makes its distance west of Paraetonium 72 Roman miles, but one of the best manuscripts gives 12, which agrees with the distance of 100 stadia in Strabo, xvii. p. 799).
