= Apostolic Vicariate of Benghazi =

Latin Catholic ecclesiastical jurisdiction in Libya

Apostolic Vicariate of Benghazi Vicariatus Apostolicus Berenicensis النيابة الرسولية بنغازي
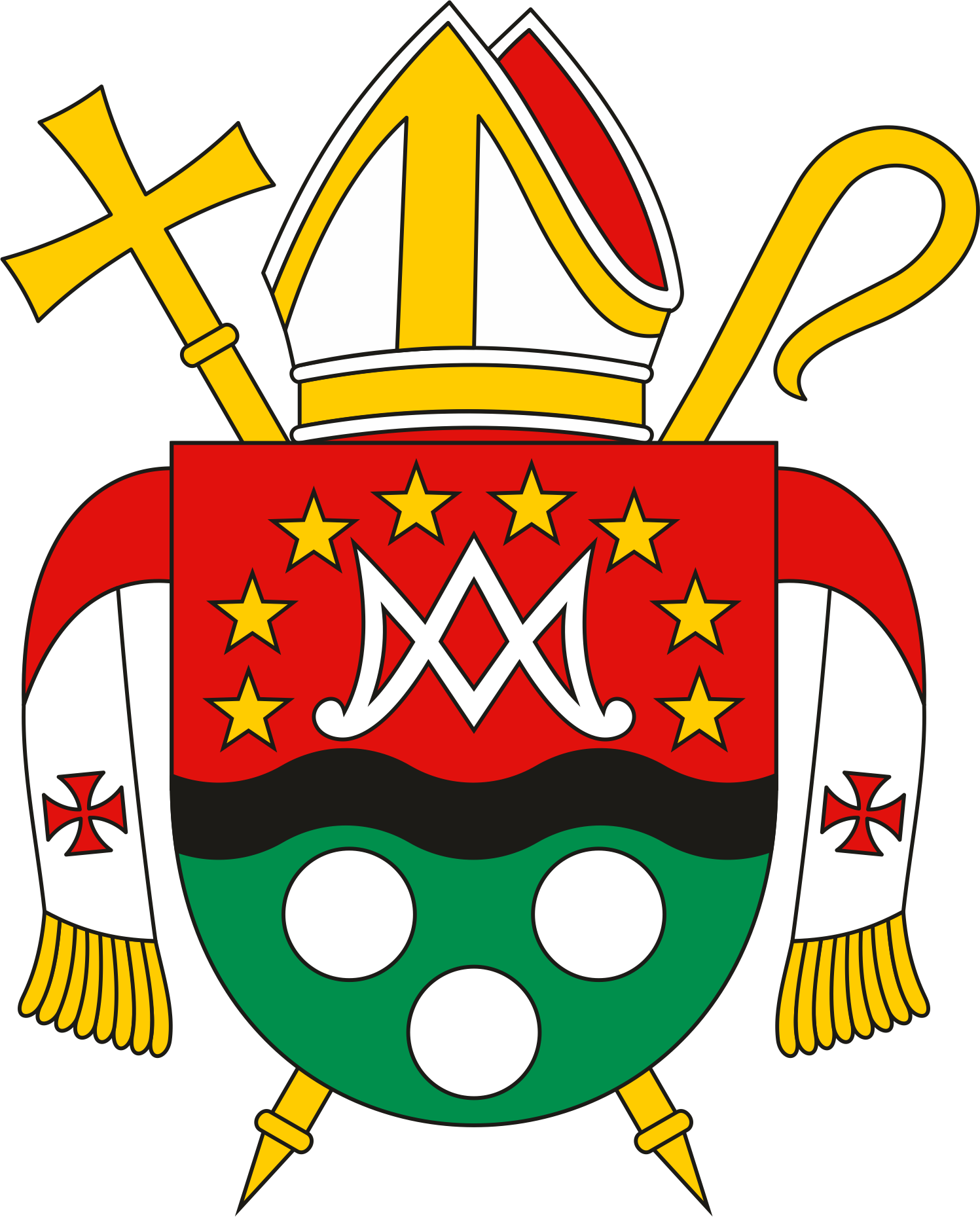

Location
- Country: Libya
- Metropolitan: Immediately exempt to the Holy See

Statistics
- Area: 757,000 km^{2} (292,000 sq mi)
- Population: Total; Catholics: (as of 2014); 1,388,000; 6,000 (0.4%)

Information
- Denomination: Catholic Church
- Sui iuris church: Latin Church
- Rite: Roman Rite

Current leadership
- Apostolic Vicar: Sandro Overend Rigillo, O.F.M.

The Apostolic Vicariate of Benghazi (Latin: Vicariatus Apostolicus Berenicensis) is a Latin Church ecclesiastical territory or apostolic vicariate of the Catholic Church in Libya.

It is immediately exempt to the Holy See and not part of any ecclesiastical province. Its cathedral, Benghazi Cathedral, is in the city of Benghazi.

== History ==
- February 3, 1927: Established as the Apostolic Vicariate of Cyrenaica, on territory split from the Apostolic Vicariate of Libya.
- On June 22, 1939, renamed as Apostolic Vicariate of Benghazi; lost territory to the newly established Apostolic Vicariate of Derna.

== Episcopal ordinaries ==
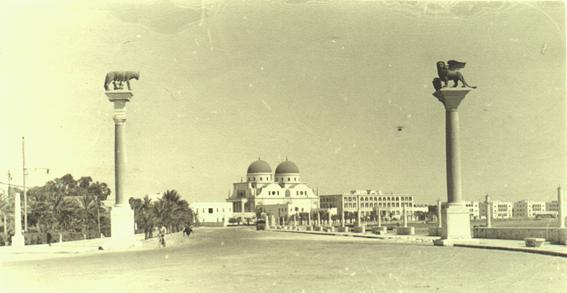
View of the Benghazi Cathedral about 1941

So far all missionary members of the Friars Minor (O.F.M.)

Apostolic Vicars of Cirenaica

- Bernardino Vitale Bigi, O.F.M., Titular Bishop of Anthedon (January 27, 1927 – April 19, 1930); also Apostolic Administrator of Mogadishu (Somalia) (1930.03 – 1930.04.19)
- Candido Domenico Moro, O.F.M., Titular Bishop of Uzita (July 14, 1931 – June 22, 1939 see below)

Apostolic Vicars of Benghazi

- Candido Domenico Moro, O.F.M. (see above June 22, 1939 – 1950)
- Ernesto Aurelio Ghiglione, O.F.M., Titular Bishop of Gauriana (July 5, 1951 – June 8, 1964)
- Giustino Giulio Pastorino, O.F.M., Titular Bishop of Babra (January 11, 1965 – March 10, 1997)
- Sylvester Carmel Magro, O.F.M., Titular Bishop of Saldæ (March 10, 1997 – February 14, 2016)
- Sandro Overend Rigillo, O.F.M. (July 16, 2023 - )

Apostolic Administrators

- George Bugeja, O.F.M., Titular Bishop of San Leone, Vicar Apostolic of Tripoli (February 14, 2016 – December 8, 2019)
- (Father) Sandro Overend Rigillo, O.F.M. (December 8, 2019 - July 16, 2023)

== Sources and external links ==
- GCatholic.org, with incumbent biography links
- Catholic Hierarchy
