= Apostolic Prefecture of Misurata =

Latin Catholic missionary jurisdiction in Libya

Coordinates: 32.3840°N 15.0800°E

The Apostolic Prefecture of Misrata is a Latin Church missionary territory or apostolic prefecture of the Catholic Church in Misrata, Libya. It is exempt to the Holy See and not part of any ecclesiastical province. The apostolic prefecture has been vacant since 1969, but instead headed by an apostolic administrator.

== History ==
The Prefecture was established on 22 June 1939, on territory split from the Apostolic Vicariate of Tripolitana (now renamed Tripoli).

== Ordinaries ==
All Friars Minor (O.F.M.) and from Italy, the Apostolic Prefects of have been :

- Vitale Bonifacio Bertoli (O.F.M.) (20 February 1948 – 5 April 1951; later Titular Bishop of Attæa and Apostolic Vicar of Tripolitana)
- Illuminato Colombo, O.F.M. (20 April 1951 – 1957)
- Guido Attilio Previtali, O.F.M. (5 December 1958 – 26 June 1969)
- Apostolic administrator Guido Attilio Previtali (4 August 1969 – 3 May 1985), Titular Bishop of Sozusa in Libya, Apostolic Vicar of Tripoli
- Apostolic administrator, Bishop Giovanni Innocenzo Martinelli, O.F.M (3 May 1985 – 5 February 2017)
- Apostolic administrator, Bishop George Bugeja, O.F.M. (5 February 2017 – 22 October 2025)
- Sede vacante As of 22 October 2025

== See also ==
- Roman Catholicism in Libya
