= Atiq Mosque =

Atiq Mosque may refer to:

- Atiq Mosque, Awjila
- Atiq Mosque (Benghazi)
- Atiq Mosque (Ghadames)
