= Atiq Mosque (Ghadames) =

Mosque in Ghadames, Libya

- Arabic: المسجد العتيق
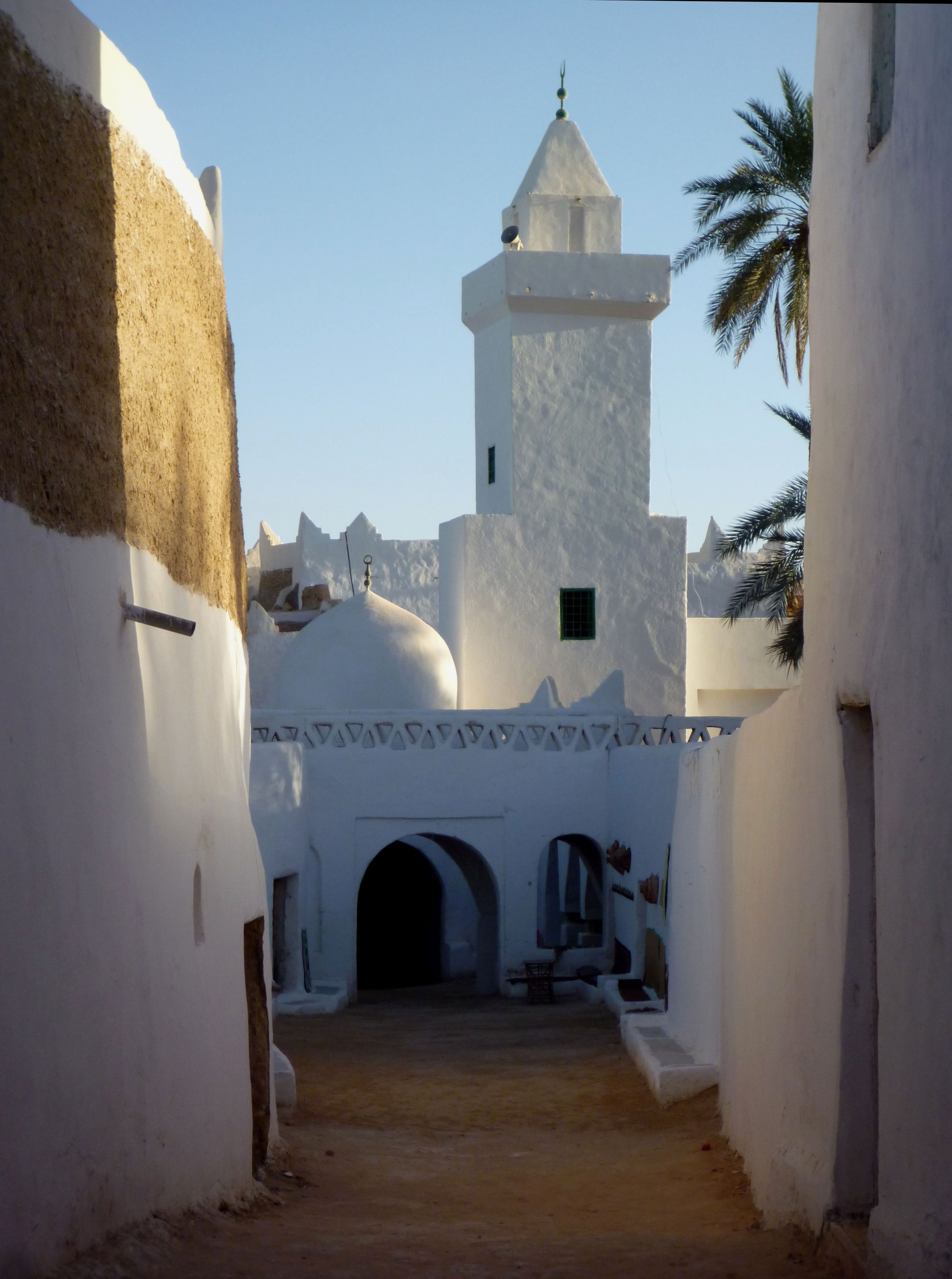
- The mosque in 2010

- Location of the mosque in Libya

Religion
- Affiliation: Islam
- Ecclesiastical or organizational status: Mosque
- Status: Active

Location
- Location: Old Town, Ghadames
- Country: Libya
- Interactive map of Atiq Mosque
- Coordinates: 30°07′57.911″N 09°29′50.406″E

Architecture
- Type: Mosque architecture
- Completed: 1258

Specifications
- Minaret: 1
- Materials: Mud brick

UNESCO World Heritage Site
- Criteria: Cultural: Built
- Designated: 1986
- Part of: Old town of Ghadames
- Reference no.: 362

Atiq Mosque (Arabic: المسجد العتيق, romanized: Masjid Al Atiq) is a mosque, located in Ghadames, Libya. Originally constructed in 1258 CE, it is one of the main and largest mosques of the old town of Ghadames.

== History ==
Ghadames has over 20 mosques among its six neighborhoods in the old town. One of the biggest mosques is Atiq mosque (عتیق مسجد), which is made of mud brick and has minimal ornamentation. It was built in 656 AH (1258/1259 CE).

The mosque known also as the Old Mosque of Ghadamès, is situated in the historic city of Ghadames in the Nalut Region of northwest Libya. The mosque's earliest recorded history dates to the time of the Islamic conquests in the seventh century CE, after which it underwent restoration and expansion. After being completely destroyed during World War II, the mosque was reconstructed while retaining its distinctive architectural design. The Atiq Mosque, which is a part of Old Town of Ghadames, was included as a UNESCO World Heritage Site in 1986.

== See also ==
- History of Islam in Libya
- List of mosques in Libya
