= Atiq mosque =

Atiq mosque means the "old mosque". It may refer to:

- Atiq Mosque (Benghazi), in Benghazi, Libya
- Atiq Mosque, Awjila, in the oasis town of Awjila, Libya
