= Tripoli Post =

Libyan newspaper

- Type: Weekly newspaper
- Format: Broadsheet
- Founded: 1999; 27 years ago
- Ceased publication: c. 2016
- Headquarters: Tripoli Tower, Tripoli

The Tripoli Post was a newspaper that claims to have been founded in 1999 during Muammar Gaddafi's period of rule in Libya.

== Creation ==
The Tripoli Post claims to have been founded in 1999.

== Gaddafi period and 2011 Civil War ==
Sami Zaptia wrote for the Tripoli Post for a decade during the Gaddafi period. Many of his articles were not published. During the 2011 Libyan Civil War, Zaptia, frustrated with the lack of freedom at Tripoli Post, quit the paper and helped found a new online newspaper, the Libya Herald, aiming at quality journalism.

== After the 2011 Civil War ==
The Tripoli Post continued publishing after the 2011 Civil War through to early 2016 during the Second Libyan Civil War.
