= Al-Kabir mosque =

Al-Kabir mosque means "the great mosque", or perhaps "the main mosque". It may refer to:

- Atiq Mosque, Awjila, a mosque in the oasis village of Awjila in the Sahara desert of the Cyrenaica region of eastern Libya
- Great Mosque of Aleppo, the largest and one of the oldest mosques in the city of Aleppo, Syria
- Great Mosque of Gaza, the largest and oldest mosque in the Gaza Strip, located in Gaza's old city
- Great Mosque of Sana'a, an ancient mosque in Sana'a, Yemen
- Umayyad Mosque, also known as the Great Mosque of Damascus
