= Gurgi Mosque =

Mosque in Tripoli, Libya

- Arabic: جامع قرجي
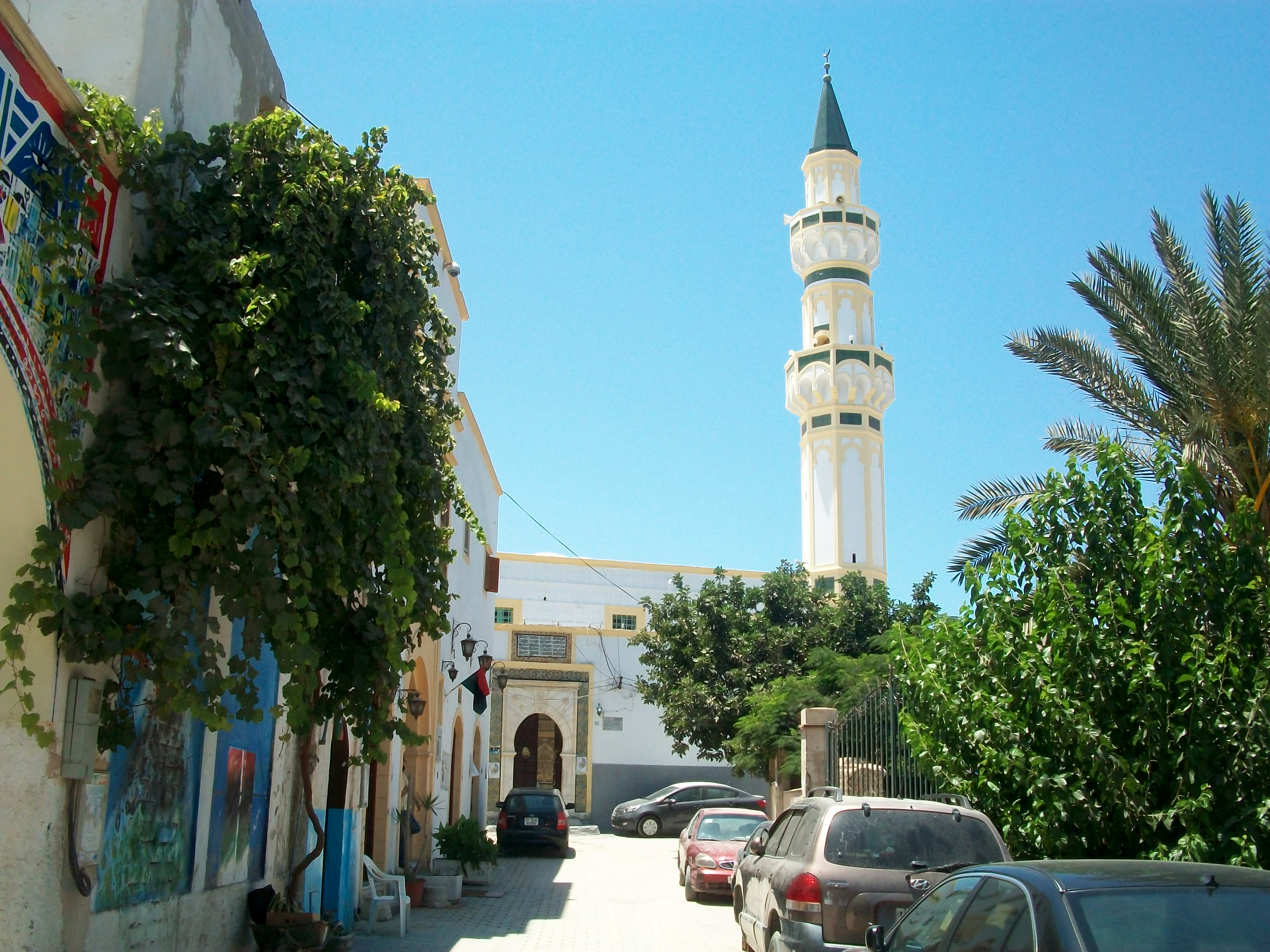
- The mosque exterior, in 2012

- Location of the mosque in Tripoli

Religion
- Affiliation: Sunni Islam
- Ecclesiastical or organizational status: Mosque
- Status: Active

Location
- Location: Tripoli, Tripolitania
- Country: Libya
- Interactive map of Gurgi Mosque
- Coordinates: 32°53′58″N 13°10′32″E

Architecture
- Type: Mosque architecture
- Style: Ottoman
- Completed: 1834

Specifications
- Dome: 15
- Minaret: One
- Minaret height: 25 m (82 ft)
- Materials: Marble

The Gurgi Mosque (Arabic: جامع قرجي) is a Sunni Islam mosque, located in Tripoli, Libya. The mosque lies in the heart of old Tripoli (the Medina) as part of a complex of historic buildings. The mosque is an important tourist attraction, as is the area as a whole; nearby is the Roman Arch of Marcus Aurelius.

== History ==
The mosque was commissioned by Mustafa Gurgi and built in 1834. Tripoli then was under Ottoman ruler Pasha Yusuf Karamanli, whose reign extended from 1795 to 1832.The Gurgi Mosque was built by the command of the naval captain Mustafa Gurgi. Gurgi is an Arabic word which means "from Georgia". To the right of the entrance lies the antechamber which houses the tombs of Gurgi and his family. The historic monument mixes European and Islamic geometrics in a way that blends architectural styles from several civilizations in to one statement of art. The Mustafa Gurgi Mosque is located in the Bab al-Bahr district, immediately beside the Mediterranean Sea's coasts. This mosque, like the Ahmed Pasha Karamanli Mosque, is made up of three architectural blocks: the mosque, the tomb, and the school. This mosque has two entrances, one to the west on Al-Akwash Street and the other onto a short alley on the northern side.

== Structure ==
The historic landmark mixes European and Islamic geometrics into a single manifestation of art and beauty, fusing numerous architectural styles from different civilizations. Its walls and columns are adorned with natural marble, and its flooring are covered in multi-colored tiles, creating a wonderfully inspirational and appealing retreat.

The minaret is an essential architectural component of the mosque. It is approximately 25 m (82 ft) tall and has two balconies made of genuine green marble. The mosque's arched entryway are engraved with floral designs, as well as the prayer hall, with its towering marble columns, that provide significant creative results. The Gurgi Mosque is constructed with 15 decorative domes.

Visitors may explore the calligraphy on the walls, which are inscribed with Quranic passages in Andalusian script, as well as a variety of embellishments of geometric forms, plants, and flowers. In the courtyard of the mosque, like in other typical Ottoman-built mosques, there is a mausoleum for the founder, as well as other facilities.

== See also ==
- History of Islam in Libya
- List of mosques in Libya
