= Ali bin Abi Talib Mosque (Tobruk) =

Mosque in Tobruk, Butnan, Libya

- Arabic: مسجد علي بن أبي طالب
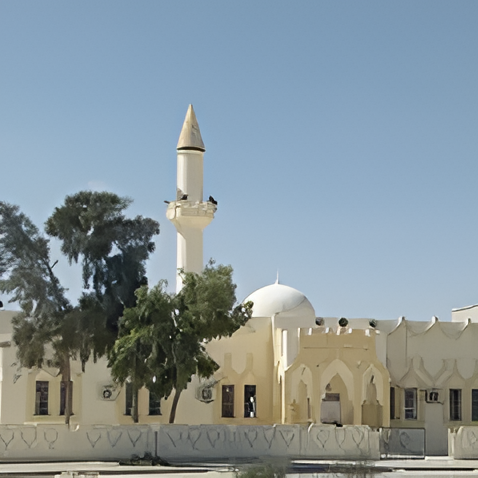

- Location of the mosque in Libya

Religion
- Affiliation: Sunni Islam
- Ecclesiastical or organizational status: Mosque
- Status: Active

Location
- Location: Tobruk, Butnan
- Country: Libya
- Interactive map of Ali bin Abi Talib Mosque
- Coordinates: 32°04′49.6″N 23°59′04.0″E

Architecture
- Type: Mosque architecture

The Ali bin Abi Talib Mosque (Arabic: مسجد علي بن أبي طالب) is a Sunni Islam mosque, located in Tobruk, in Butnan District of Libya.

== History ==
In August 2021, authorities temporarily closed the mosque due to a spike in COVID‑19 infections among congregants. The closure lasted for five days during which all prayer rugs were removed and the facility was thoroughly disinfected as part of broader preventative measures implemented by the Tobruk Office of Endowments and Islamic Affairs.

== See also ==
- History of Islam in Libya
- List of mosques in Libya
