= Al-Naqah Mosque =

Mosque in Tripoli, Libya

- Arabic: الجامع الناقة
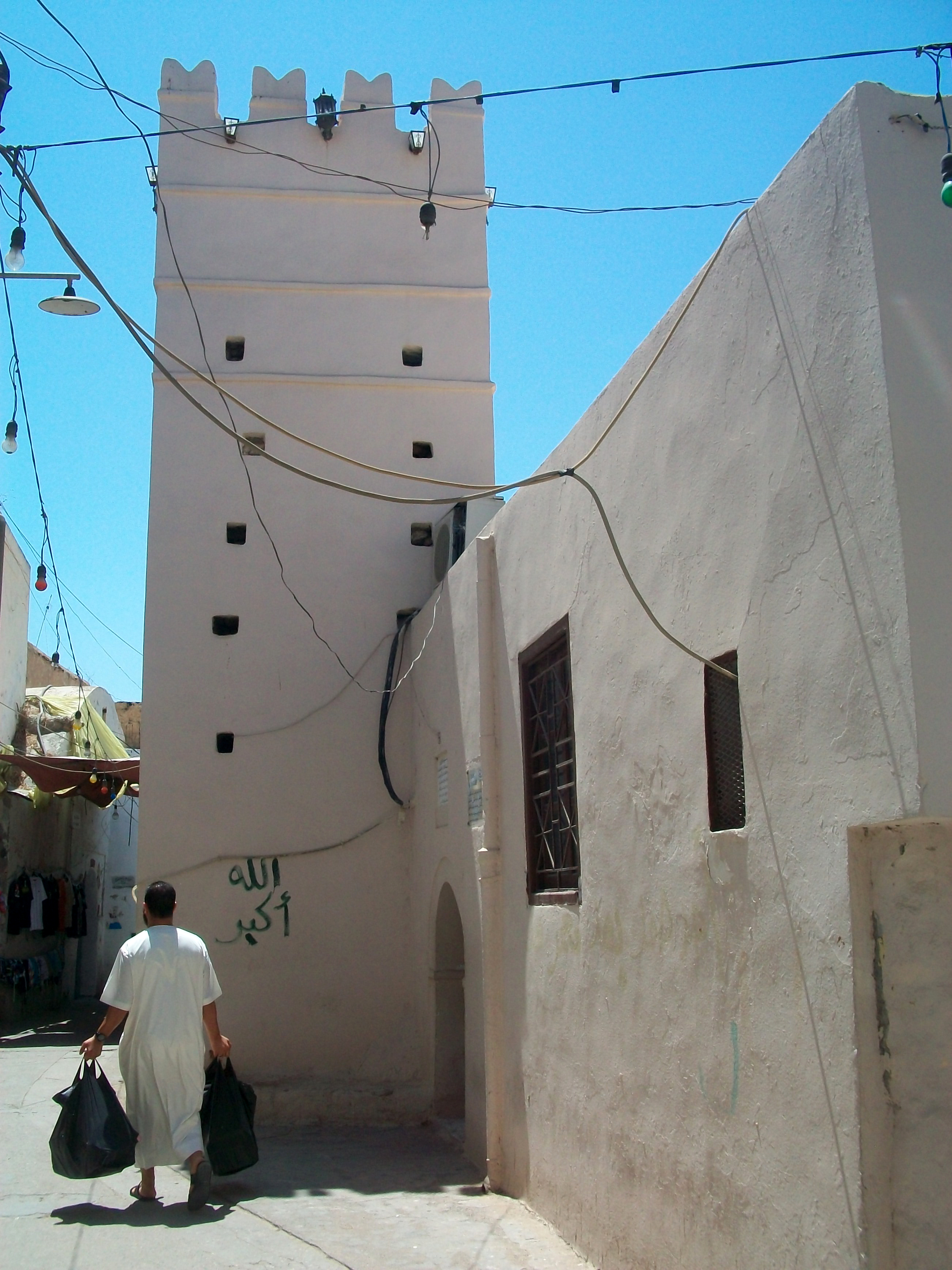

- Location of the mosque in Tripoli

Religion
- Affiliation: Islam
- Ecclesiastical or organisational status: Mosque
- Status: Active

Location
- Location: Tripoli, Tripolitania
- Country: Libya
- Coordinates: 32°53′43″N 13°10′44″E

Architecture
- Type: Mosque architecture
- Style: Islamic
- Founder: al-Mu'izz
- Completed: c. 10th century (1st recording); 1611 (reconstruction)

Specifications
- Dome: 42
- Minaret: 1
- Materials: Marble; granite

The al-Naqah Mosque or Naga Mosque (Arabic: الجامع الناقة, lit. 'mosque of the [female] camel') is a historic mosque in Tripoli, Libya.

== History ==
The history of the mosque is not well-documented and it is not entirely certain when it was founded or when all of its multiple restorations took place. It is believed to be the oldest Islamic-era monument in Tripoli. It was most likely first built in 973 on the orders of the Fatimid caliph al-Mu'izz, who stayed in the city around this time during his journey to move the Fatimid court from Ifriqiya to Egypt.

Two similar apocryphal stories are associated with the mosque and purport to explain its name (al-Naqah, meaning a "female camel"). One recounts that when Amr ibn al-As captured Tripoli during the Muslim conquest of North Africa in the 7th century, the people of the city offered him a female camel laden with riches to persuade him to grant them amnesty. He refused the gift and instead told them to build this mosque with the funds it provided. The other version says that it was the Fatimid caliph al-Mu'izz who gifted the city's people with a female camel laden with gold, in return for their generosity in welcoming him. The people then used the gold to fund the construction of the mosque.

The mosque was badly damaged or destroyed during the Spanish occupation of Tripoli in the 16th century. An inscription records that it was reconstructed in 1610–1611 (1019 AH) by the Ottoman-era governor Safar Dey.

== Architecture ==
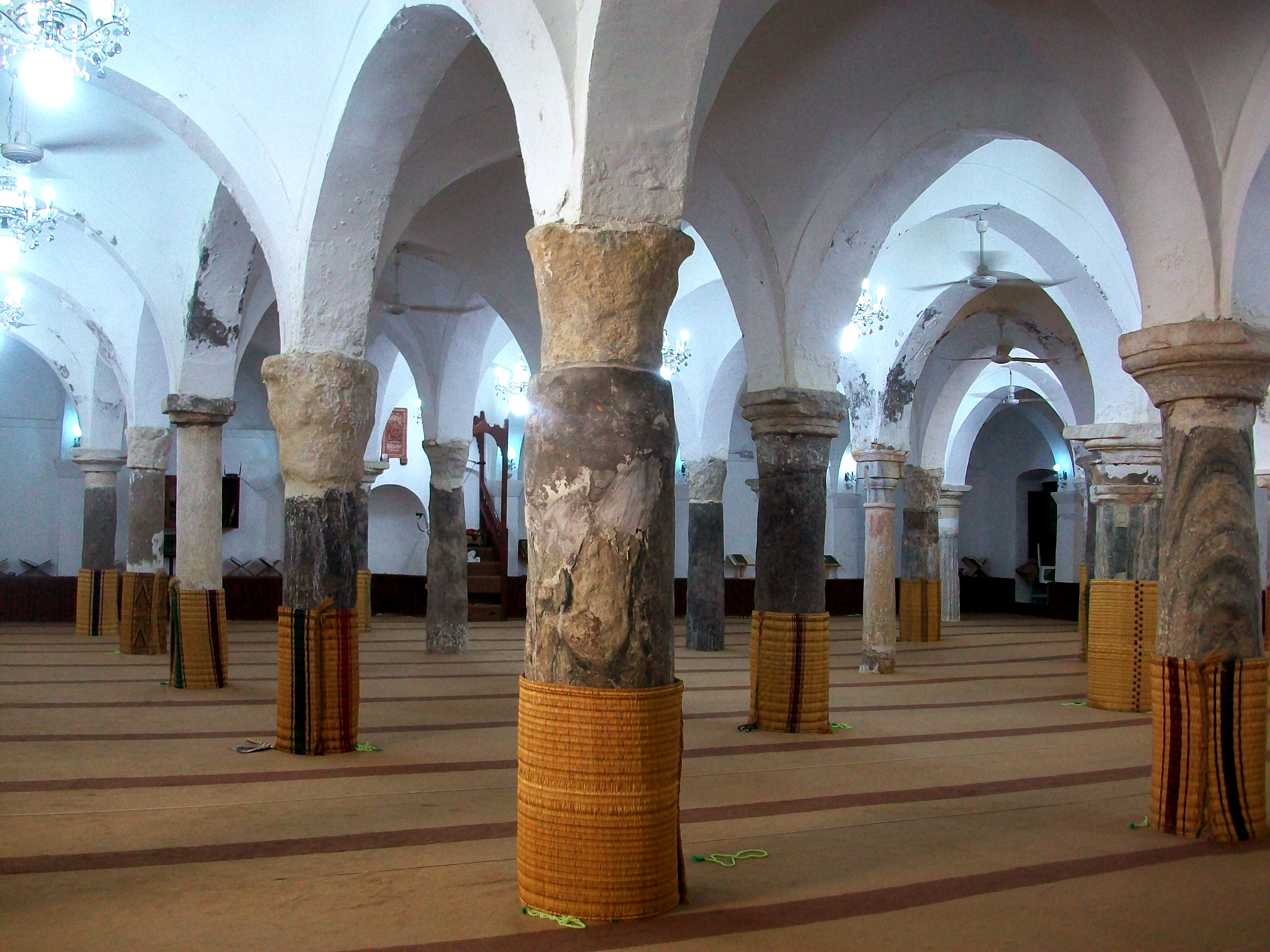
View of the mosque's hypostyle interior

The mosque's layout is somewhat irregular, suggesting multiple modifications throughout its history. The floor plan is roughly rectangular: the southeast wall (corresponding to the qibla or direction of prayer) is 44.24 m (145.1 ft) long, the northeast wall is 19.35 m (63.5 ft) long, the southwest wall is approximately 20.3 m (67 ft) long, and the northwest wall is approximately 39.4 m (129 ft) long. The floor level of the mosque is now 0.4 m (1 ft 4 in) below the level of the present-day city streets. The building is divided between a roughly square courtyard (sahn) section and a hypostyle prayer hall.

The prayer hall is divided by rows of columns into seven aisles running parallel with the qibla (southeast) wall. The qibla wall in this section measures 20.1 m (66 ft), while the northwest and northeast walls of this section measure 18.1 m (59 ft) each. The 36 columns of the hall include re-used Roman and Byzantine columns of marble and granite, as well as Roman capitals. Except for the slightly smaller aisle on the northwest edge of the hall, which is covered by a vault, each aisle of the hall is covered by 7 domes, for a total of 42 domes.

The mihrab of the mosque is roughly in the middle of the qibla wall. Its orientation is slightly further east from the rest of the mosque due to a later restoration aiming to correct its qibla alignment. It is decorated with the image of a flower and an Arabic inscription stating the Shahada ("There is no god but Allah. Muhammad is the messenger of Allah.") A wooden minbar stands next to it today. In an arched niche behind it is a stone which might have been part of an older minbar.

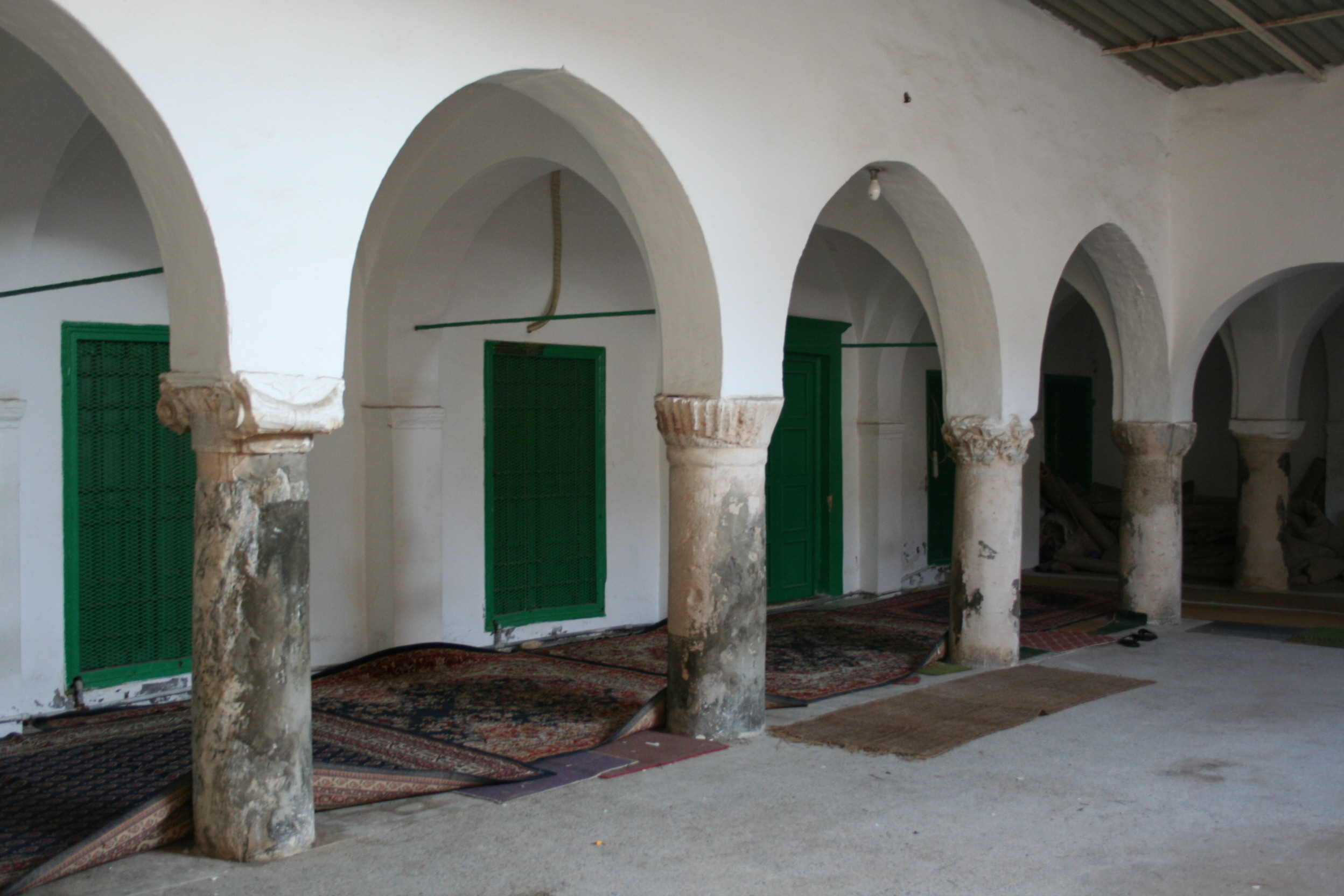
Gallery around the mosque's courtyard

The courtyard of the mosque is surrounded on all four sides by a covered gallery supported on columns. On the qibla side, the gallery is two aisles deep, while on the other sides it is only one aisle, each one approximately 3 m (9.8 ft) wide. Two of the galleries, on the southwest and northwest, have flat roofs dating from more recent restorations, while the other two are covered by cross-vaults.

The minaret, attached to the outside of the mosque, is a cuboid tower with a 5.6 m^{2} (60 sq ft) base.

== See also ==
- History of Islam in Libya
- List of mosques in Libya
