= As-Sahabah Mosque =

Mosque in Derna, Libya

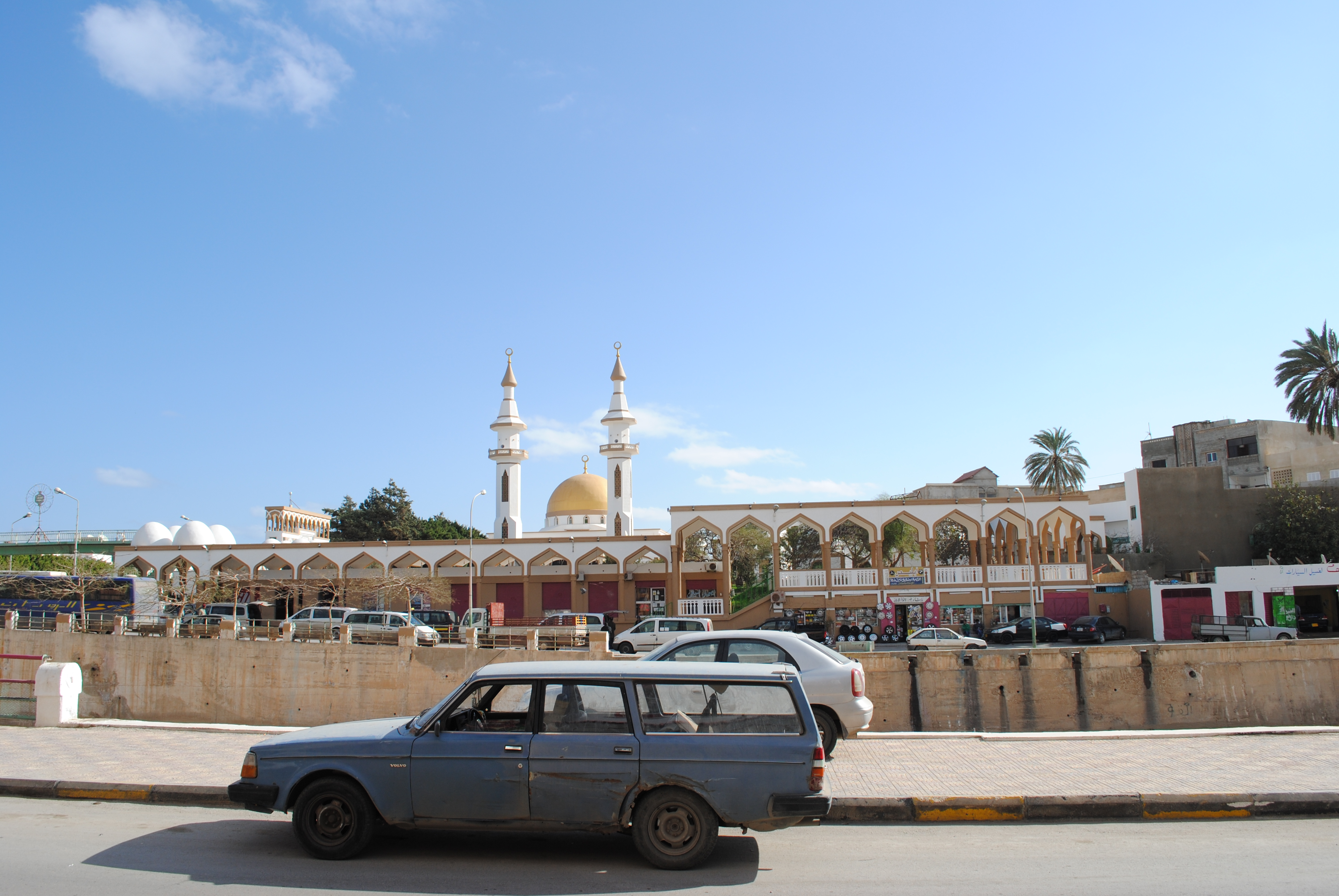
- The mosque as seen in 2009.

- Location in Libya

Religion
- Affiliation: Sunni Islam

Location
- Location: QJ4Q+63Q, Wadi Darnah, Derna, Libya
- Country: Libya
- Interactive map of As-Sahabah Mosque
- Coordinates: 32.7615737°N 22.6423884°E

Architecture
- Type: Mosque
- Style: Islamic architecture
- Completed: 1975
- Destroyed: 2012–2014 (shrines); 2023 (cemetery): Mosque itself is still intact

Specifications
- Dome: 2
- Minaret: 2
- Shrine: 3 (destroyed)

The As-Sahabah Mosque (Arabic: مسجد الصحابة) is a mosque located in Derna, Libya. Built in 1975, it is located next to a cemetery containing the tombs of seventy-three Muslim soldiers of the Umayyad Caliphate who were casualties in the aftermath of the 7th-century Battle of Mamma.

== Etymology ==
The mosque is named after the Sahaba, the companions of the Islamic prophet Muhammad.

== History ==
After the Battle of Mamma in 688, the victorious Umayyad army led by Zuhayr ibn Qays al-Balawi headed back to Arabia, but were ambushed on the way home in Derna by a platoon of Byzantine raiders that were able to successfully eliminate all of them in order to avenge Kusaila, their Berber Christian ally who was killed in the earlier battle. Out of respect for their rivals, the Byzantine soldiers buried the seventy-three slain Muslim soldiers at a nearby field. During the Ottoman rule over Libya, three domed shrines were erected over the graves of Zuhayr ibn Qays al-Balawi as well as two other Sahaba, Abdullah ibn Barr and Abu Mansur al-Farsi. It also served as a burial place for the villagers as well as the governors of Ottoman Tripolitania, which included an individual named Muhammad Bey, who commissioned a tomb for himself in the cemetery.

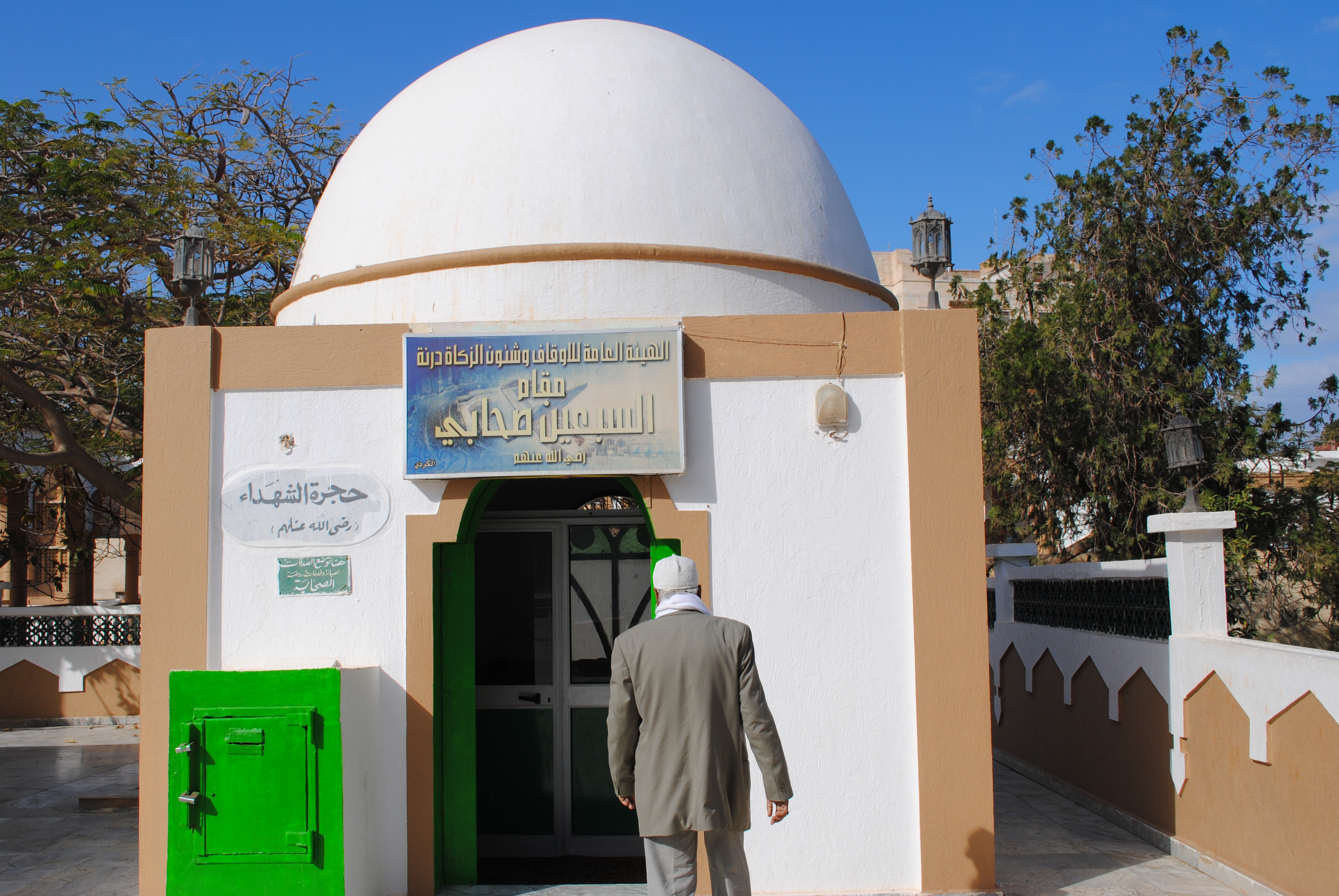
A domed shrine which marks a mass grave of seventy Muslim soldiers.

It was not until the late 1960s that the residents of Derna collaborated to build a mosque next to the cemetery to honour the seventy-three Muslim martyrs. Construction on the mosque began in 1970 and was officially completed by 1975. The nearby open city space in front of the mosque was also renamed as the Maydan Al Sahaba Square after the mosque had been opened to the public.

In 2012, the As-Sahabah Mosque was damaged in a bomb attack by Haftar-aligned radicalists that targeted the cemetery next to it, resulting in the destruction of the tomb of Zuhayr ibn Qays al-Balawi, although the deceased body was found to have been mummified, likely due to temperature and terrain conditions. Later in 2014, the mosque was attacked thrice. The first attack occurred on 8 May after the Fajr prayer, when an explosion rang out in the nearby cemetery. The second attack occurred on 30 May, with radicalists planting explosives in the cemetery, causing heavy damages to the mausoleums. The third and final attack occurred on 18 June, when the Haftar-aligned militants broke into the mosque with bulldozers and demolished the mausoleum of Muhammad Bey in the cemetery.

The mosque sustained further damage in 2023, when Storm Daniel caused the collapse of two dams after months of excessive rainfall. The city of Derna was intensely flooded with water from the dams, resulting in damage to the floor of the mosque and the complete destruction of the cemetery. In the same year, after the floods had commenced, the ruined mosque became a stage for protests against Khalifa Haftar.

Restoration works to the As-Sahabah Mosque commenced in April 2024. However, no restoration efforts could be made for the cemetery, which had been completely razed by the intense floods. Some bodies discovered from the cemetery that had been swept ashore were reburied in an undisclosed location. The mosque was fully reconstructed by late February 2025 and subsequently held its first Eid prayer since 2023, which was attended by a large crowd of residents who rejoiced at the reconstruction of the mosque.

== See also ==
- Islam in Libya
- List of mosques in Libya
- Sidi Okba Mosque, a mosque located in Tunisia with a similar premise.
