= Algeria Square Mosque =

Mosque in Tripoli, Libya

Coordinates: 32°53′26″N 13°11′9″E

- Arabic: جامع جمال عبد الناصر
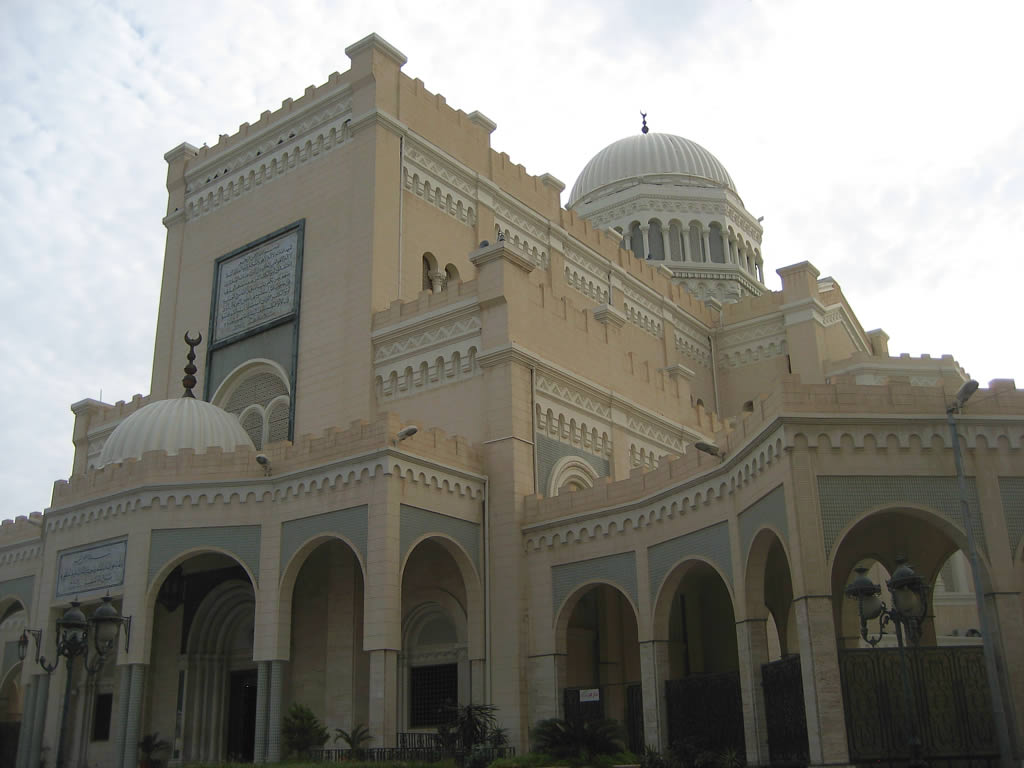
- The mosque exterior, in 2010

- Location of the mosque in Tripoli

Religion
- Affiliation: Islam
- Province: Tripoli
- Region: Islam
- Ecclesiastical or organizational status: Mosque (since 1970s); Cathedral (1928–1970s)
- Status: Active

Location
- Location: Algeria/Elgazayer Square, Tripoli, Tripolitania
- Country: Libya
- Interactive map of Algeria Square Mosque

Architecture
- Type: Church architecture; Mosque architecture
- Style: Romanesque Revival
- Completed: 1928 (as a church); c. 1970s (as a mosque)

Specifications
- Dome: One
- Dome height (outer): 46 m (151 ft)

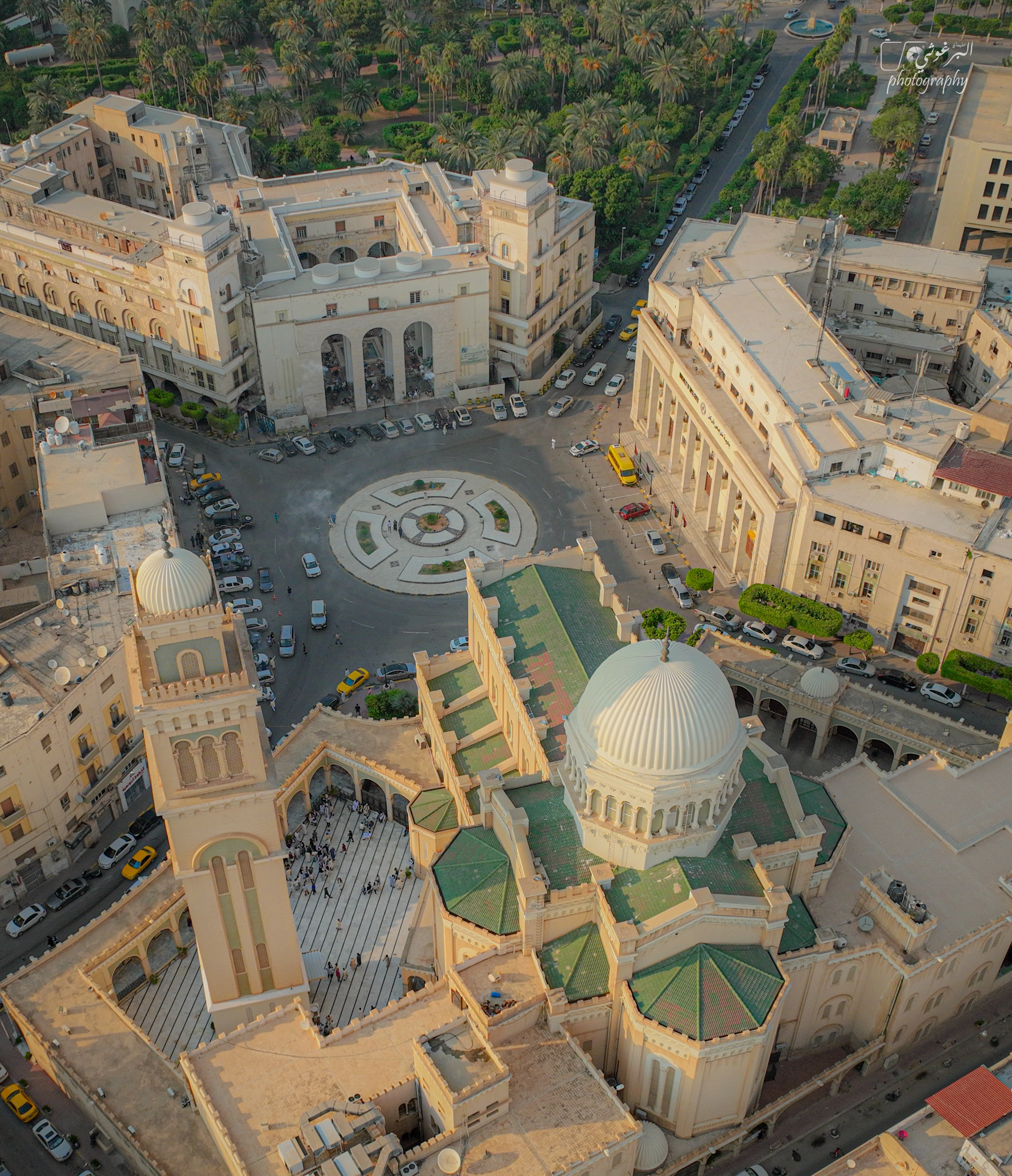

The Algeria Square Mosque, or Jamal Abdul Nasser Mosque (Arabic: جامع جمال عبد الناصر) is a mosque located on Algeria/Elgazayer Square (Maidan al Jazair/Maydan elgazayer) in the city centre of Tripoli, the capital of Libya. Completed as the Tripoli Cathedral in the 1920s during the Italian Libya colonial era, the building was repurposed as the mosque in c. 1970.

== History ==
In July 1970, after the rise to power of Muammar Gaddafi, the Revolutionary Council ordered the confiscation of all Italian and church property. In September of the same year, the Vicar Apostolic of Benghazi was expelled and the cathedral was closed.

The cathedral was subsequently transformed into a mosque, called the Gamal Abdel Nasser Mosque or Algeria Square Mosque. Due to the controversial nature of this information, and due to intentional Historical negationism by the Gaddafi regime and its unreliable sources, the official conversion may have begun later with certain parts of the cathedral changed, and then fully, and visibly completed on the exterior circa late 1990–2000. The cathedral was renamed "as Jamal Abdul Nasser Mosque" and is currently being used as a place of worship.

The former cathedral retains its overall shape, with the main basilica and separate bell tower (campanile) shape. However, the façade of the building and the interior have undergone major changes.

As of 2020, the mosque was open to public and can be visited.

== See also ==
- History of Islam in Libya
- List of mosques in Libya
