= Karamanli Mosque =

Mosque in Tripoli, Libya

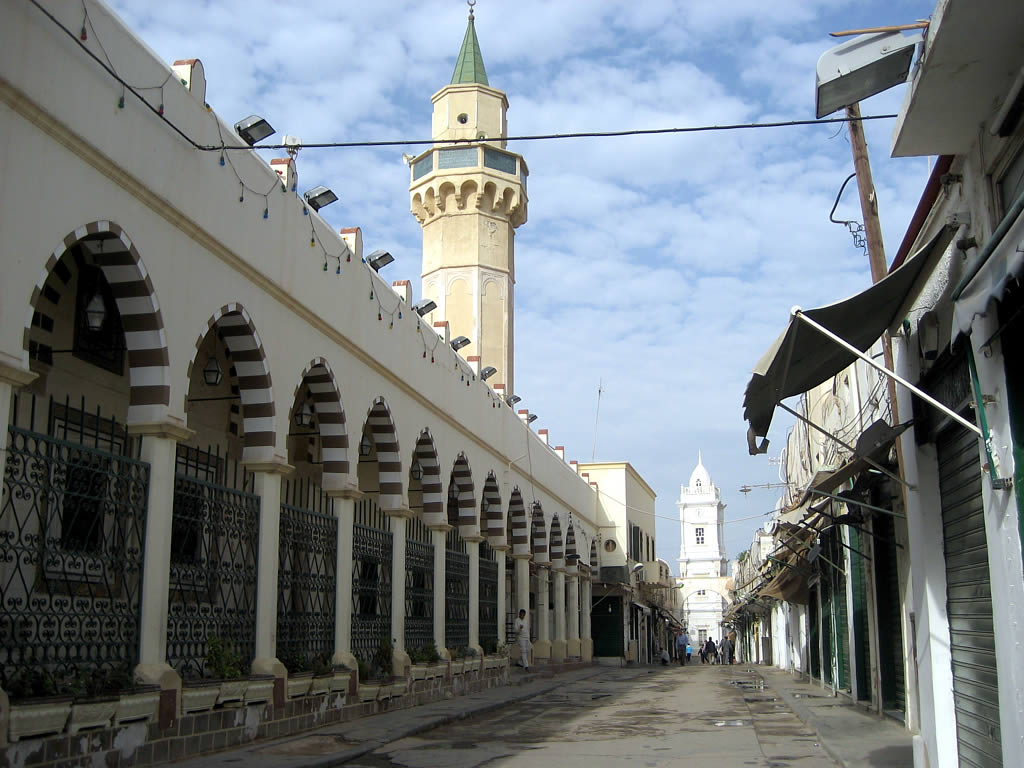
- The mosque in 2010

- Location of the mosque in Tripoli

Religion
- Affiliation: Islam
- Ecclesiastical or organisational status: Mosque
- Status: Active

Location
- Location: Tripoli, Tripolitania
- Country: Libya

Architecture
- Type: Mosque architecture
- Founder: Ahmed Karamanli
- Groundbreaking: 1736
- Minaret: One

The Karamanli Mosque, also known as the Ahmed Karamanli Mosque, is an 18th-century mosque in Tripoli, Libya.

== History ==
The mosque is named after Ahmed Karamanli, who started its construction in 1736. It is part of a larger complex which includes a madrasa and tombs of the members of the Karamanli dynasty. The mosque has entrances on three sides.

The mosque was vandalized in 2014 during the Libyan civil war. It's ceramic tiles and marble decorations were damaged during the attack, which was condemned by UNESCO.

== See also ==
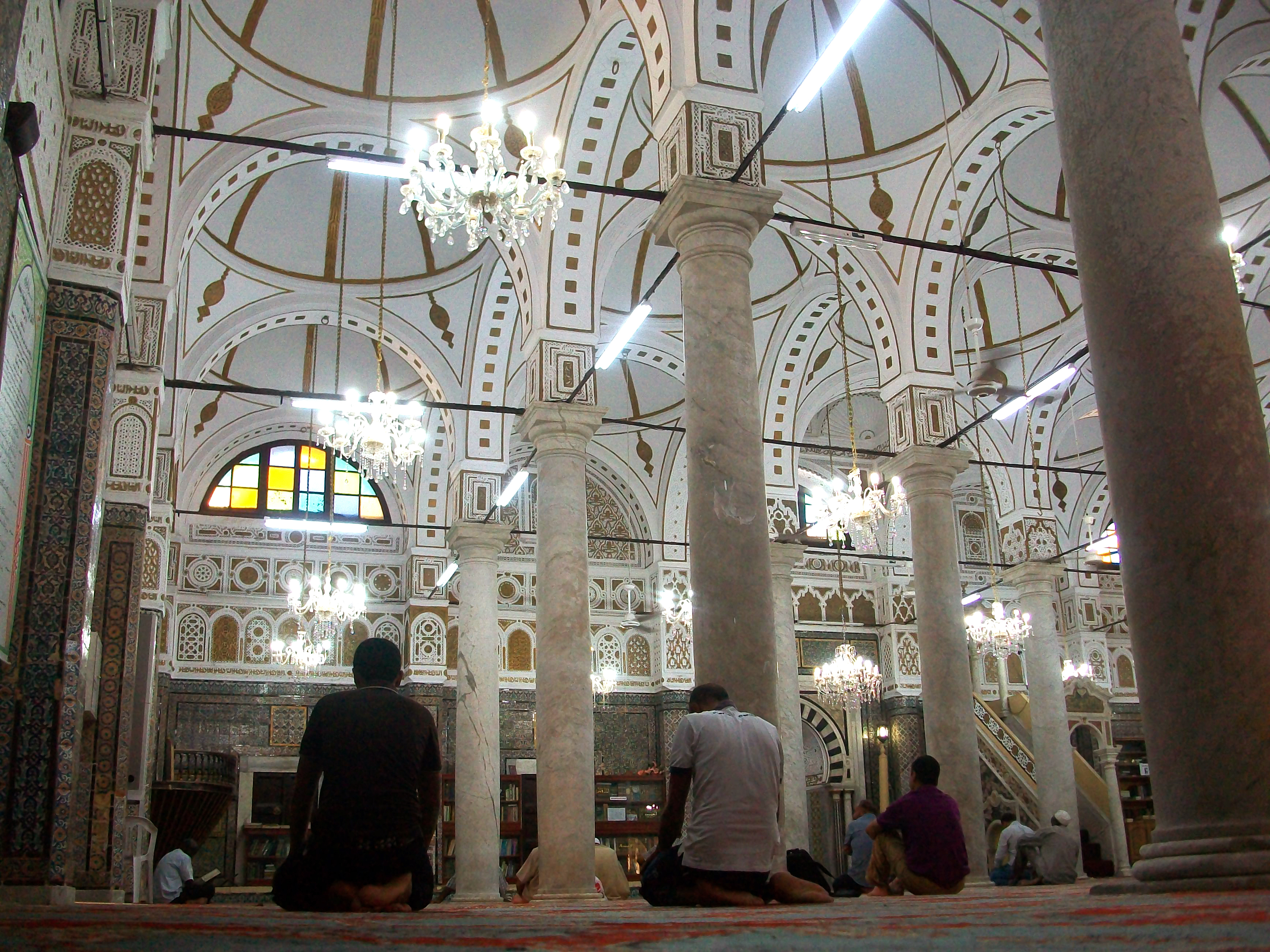
The mosque interior

- History of Islam in Libya
- List of mosques in Libya
