= Al Hayat Tower =

Hotel in Tripoli, Libya

Al Hayat Tower by Lancaster
- Main facade of the hotel, 2012

- Location within Tripoli, Libya

General information
- Location: Al Kurnish Road, Tripoli, Libya
- Coordinates: 32°53′26.28″N 13°9′51.88″E
- Opening: 15 February 2011 (as JW Marriott Hotel Tripoli); 29 November 2025 (as Al Hayat Tower)
- Operator: Lancaster Hotels

Height
- Height: 130 m (430 ft)

Technical details
- Floor count: 36

Other information
- Number of rooms: 370

The Al Hayat Tower by Lancaster is a five star hotel in the central business district of Tripoli, Libya. Opened on 15 February 2011 JW Marriott Hotel Tripoli before the onset of the Libyan Civil War, it initially closed after just 14 days, before being unoperational for 14 years. Renovations began in 2014 and were on-and-off consecutively for over 13 years before and reopening under its current name by Lancaster Hotels from Lebanon on 29 November 2025.

== History ==
The Al Hayat Tower opened on 15 February 2011 as the JW Marriott Hotel Tripoli, just days before the Libyan Civil War began. It closed just two weeks later and the hotel's few guests and 185 staff were evacuated by Marriott on a chartered plane to Amman.

The hotel's original operators, Marriott stated in April 2011 that they hoped to reopen the hotel at some point. In 2013, the hotel's co-owners, the Libyan government's Economic and Social Development Fund and South Korean-based Daewoo Engineering & Construction announced their hope to reopen the hotel in 2014. On 27 November 2021, the owners again announced plans to reopen the hotel.

With renovations completed, the hotel re-opened as the Al Hayat Tower on 29 November 2025, with Lancaster Hotels of Lebanon taking over operations from Marriott with the inauguration ceremony and sod-cutting by the prime minister of Libya, Abdulhamid Dbeibah.
