= Atiq Mosque (Benghazi) =

Mosque in Benghazi, Libya

- Arabic: المسجد العتيق
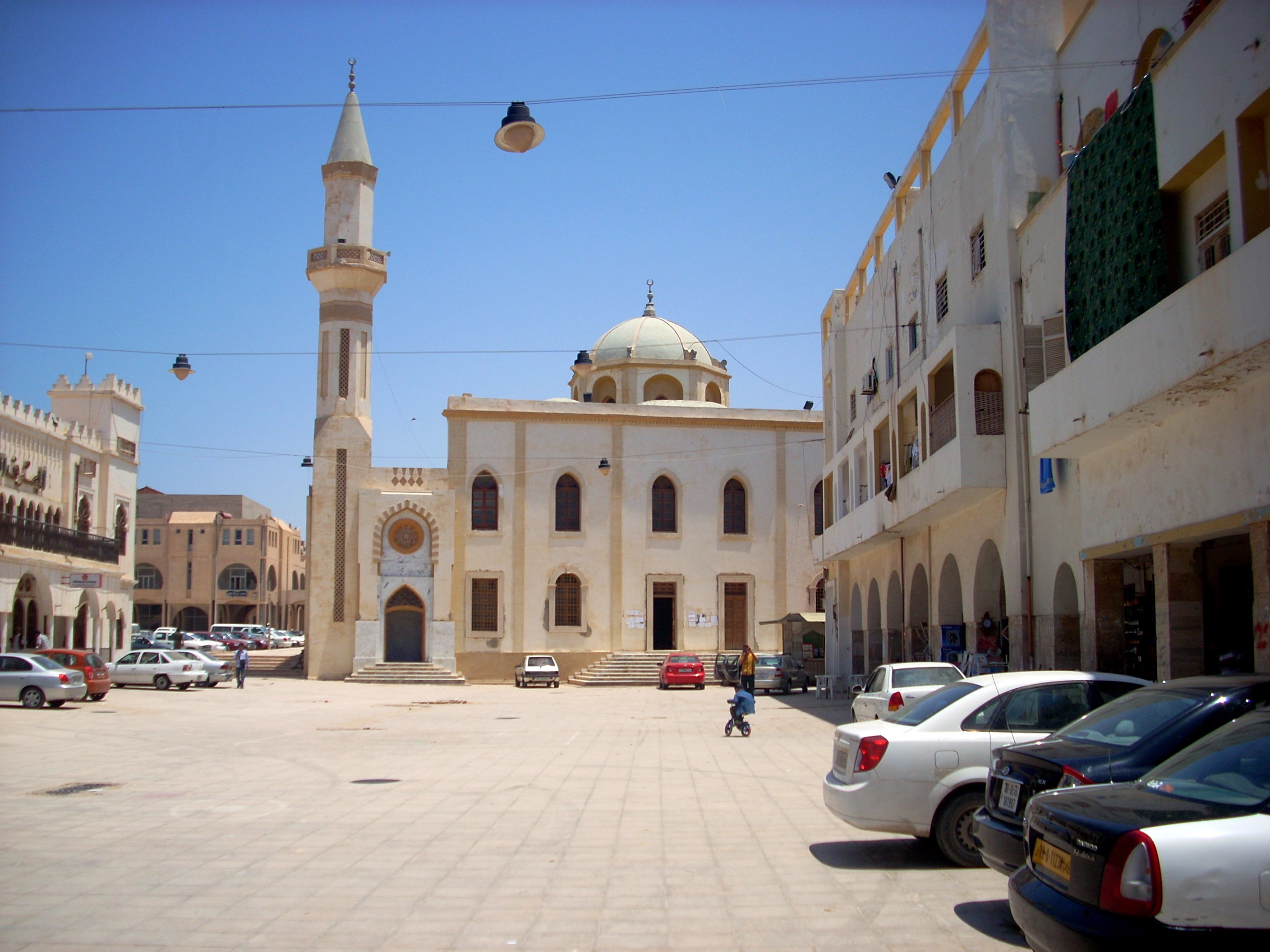
- The mosque in 2009

- Location of the mosque in Libya

Religion
- Affiliation: Sunni Islam
- Ecclesiastical or organizational status: Mosque
- Status: Active

Location
- Location: Freedom Square, Benghazi
- Country: Libya
- Interactive map of Atiq Mosque
- Coordinates: 32°07′18″N 20°03′41″E

Architecture
- Type: Mosque architecture
- Style: Ottoman
- Completed: 15th century

Specifications
- Dome: One
- Minaret: One

The Atiq Mosque (Arabic: المسجد العتيق, romanized: Al Masjid al ‘Aţīq), also known as Al-Jami al-Kabir (the Great Mosque), is a Sunni Islam mosque, located in Benghazi, Libya. It is one of the oldest and best known in the city.

The mosque forms the north side of Freedom Square. The original structure dates from the early fifteenth century, and since then received many renovations. The present central-domed structure is Ottoman in design.

== Gallery ==
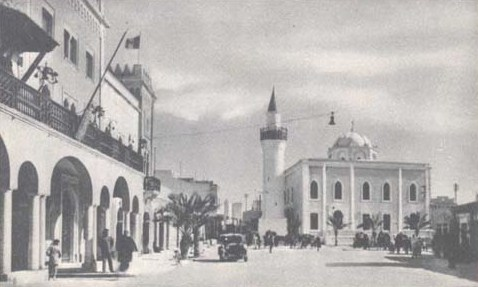
The mosque in the 1930s

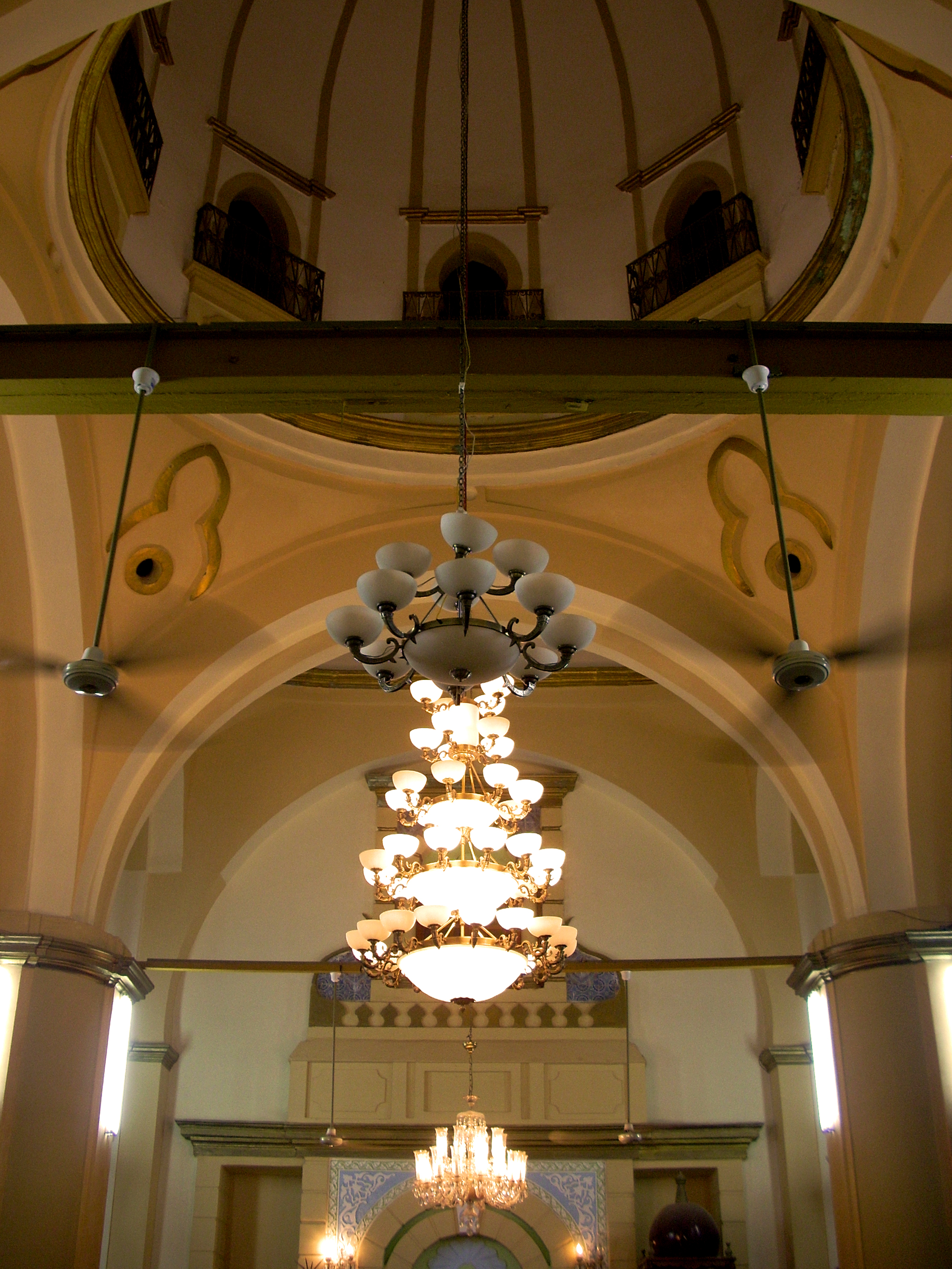
Interior of the mosque

== See also ==
- History of Islam in Libya
- List of mosques in Libya
