= Old town of Ghadames =

UNESCO World Heritage Site in Ghadames, Libya

UNESCO World Heritage Site
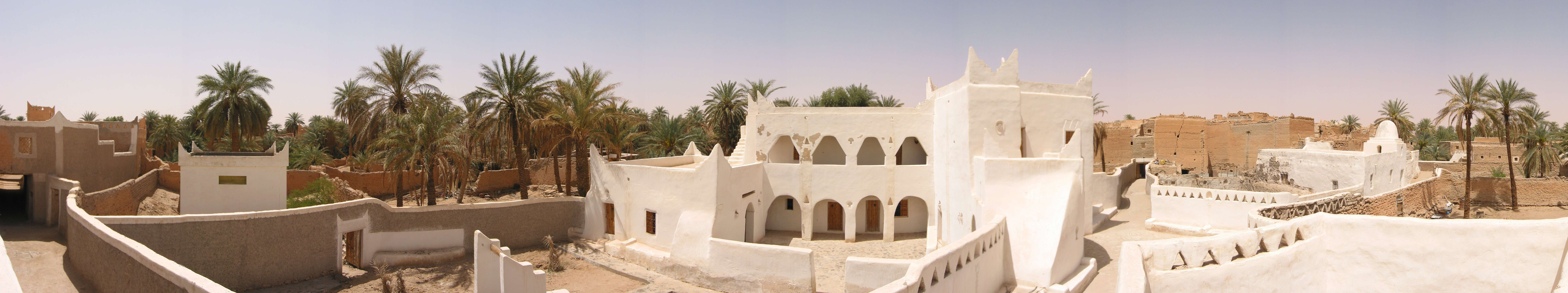
- View over the rooftops of the old town of Ghadames
- Interactive map of Old town of Ghadames
- Location: Ghadames, Libya
- Criteria: Cultural:
- Reference: 362
- Inscription: 1986 (10th Session)
- Area: 38.4 ha (95 acres)
- Coordinates: 30°07′55″N 09°29′49″E

The Old town of Ghadames (Arabic: مدينة غدامس القديمة) is the old city of the modern city of Ghadames, Libya and one of Libya's major desert cities. Called the "Jewel of the Desert" the site is registered as a UNESCO World Heritage Site since 1986.

== Urban Layout and Architecture ==
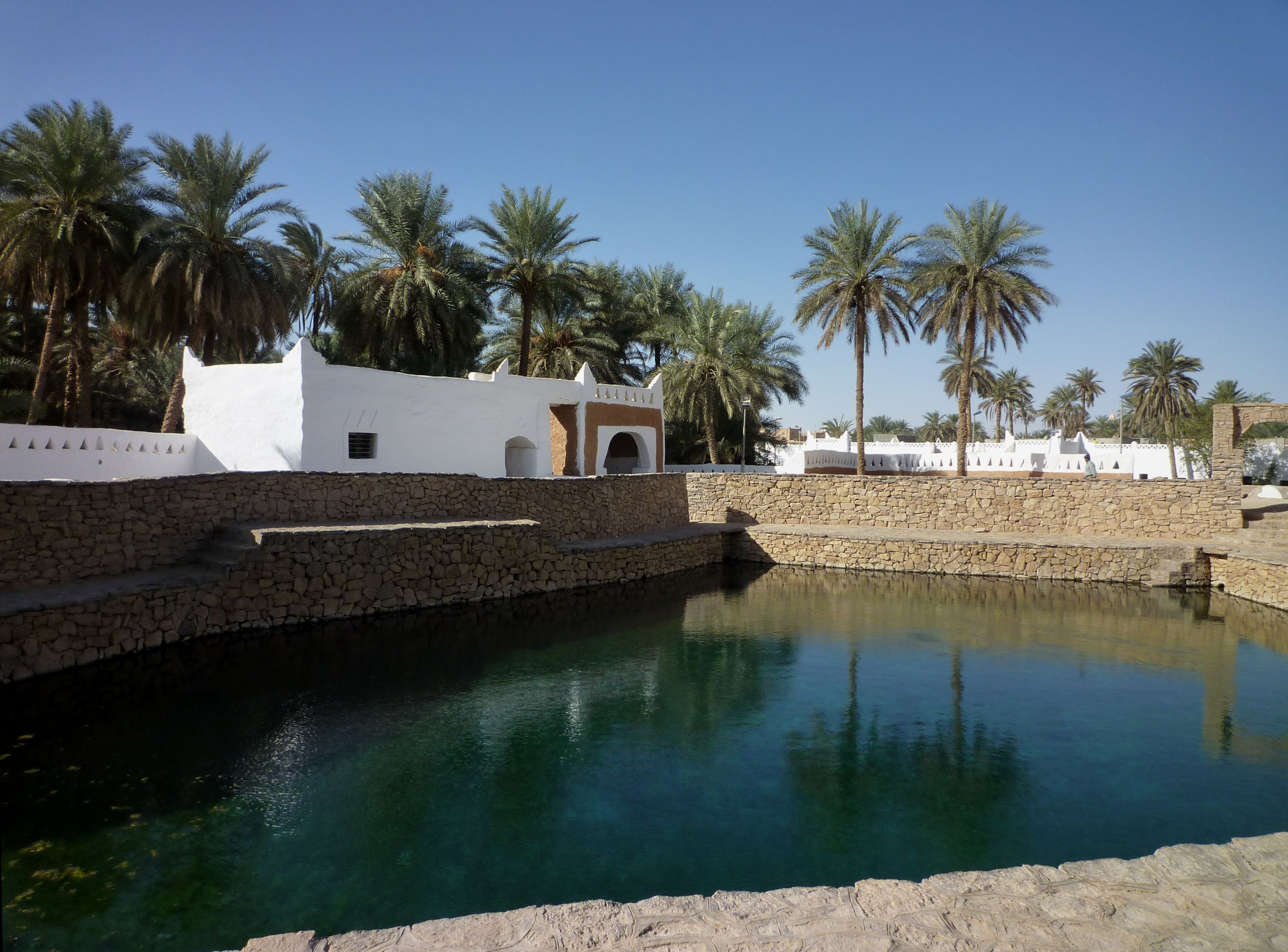
A covered alleyway in the old town

The old city of Ghadames is a dense, oasis-adjacent settlement built on the high bank of a wadi, providing a natural defense. Its design is a sophisticated adaptation to the harsh Saharan climate and reflects the social structure of its inhabitants. The city was historically divided into seven main tribal neighborhoods or mahallas: Tesku, Ait Welid, Ait Waziten, Ait Mazigh, Ait Ouligh, Ait Fersan, and Ait Darar. The interconnected urban fabric served to maximize shade, conserve space, and create a strong defensive posture.

=== Defensive Design ===
The city was historically enclosed by a fortified perimeter wall with several gates, including the main gates of Bab al-Burr, Bab al-Fars, and Bab al-Atshan. The compact, maze-like layout of the city, with its narrow and covered streets, was a key defensive feature, designed to confuse and slow down potential invaders.

=== Street Network and Social Structure ===
A defining feature of Ghadames is its two-tiered street system, which segregated daily movement by gender. Ground-level Passages: At the ground level, a network of covered, semi-dark alleyways known as sabat served as the primary thoroughfares for men. Rooftop Terraces: Above these passages, an extensive system of open-air rooftop terraces connected the houses. These terraces were the exclusive domain of women, allowing them to move freely across the city, visit neighbors, and conduct social life away from the public view of men.

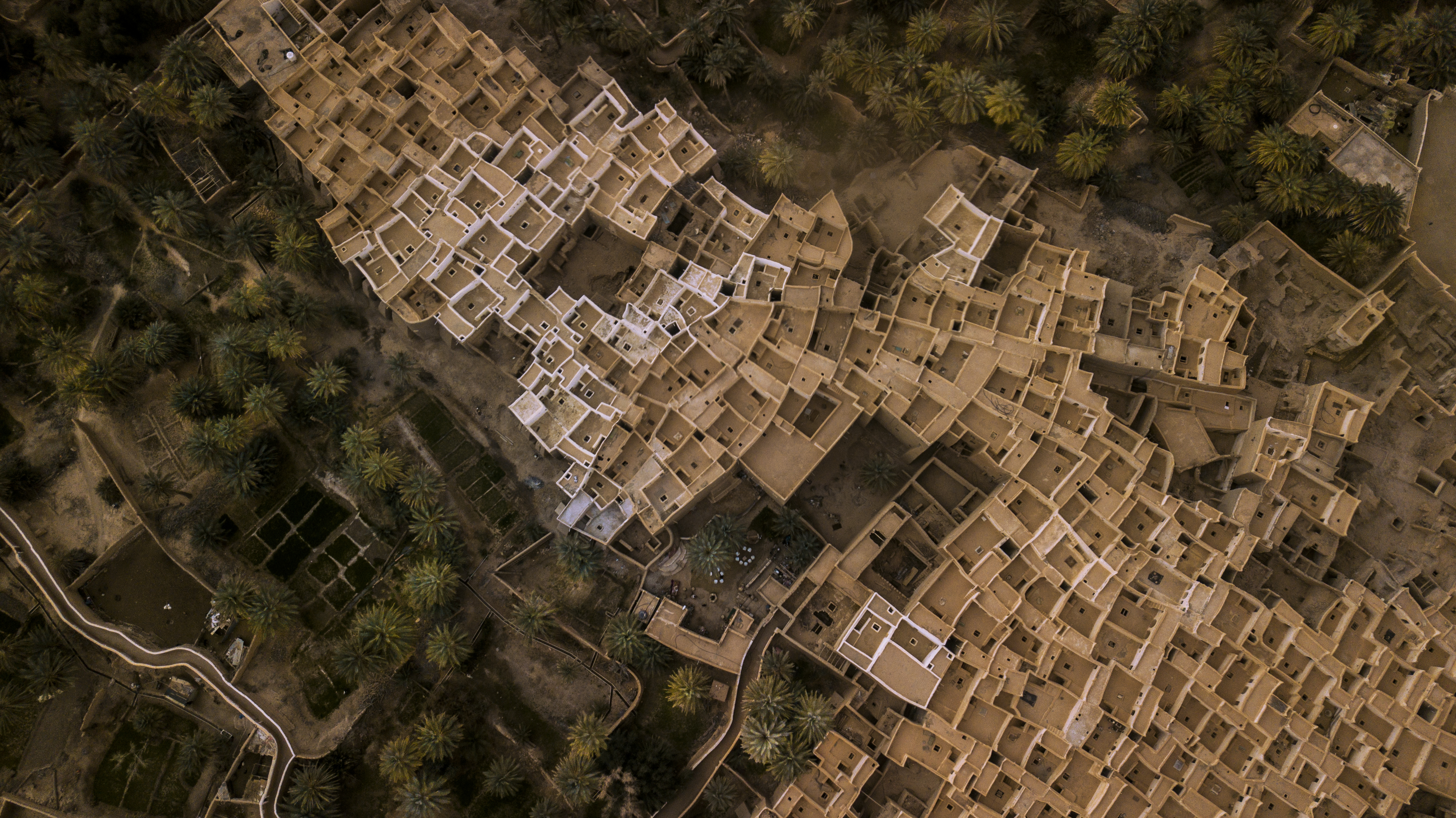
Aerial view of the old town of Ghadames, showing the continuous rooftop landscape

=== Domestic Architecture ===
Houses in Ghadames are typically four stories tall, built using local materials like mud brick, limestone, and palm wood for reinforcement and roofing. The vertical layout of the homes was organized by function: The ground floor was used for storage of supplies. The first floor was the main family living quarters, often centered around a main room or hall known as the wast ad-dar. The upper levels and the roof terrace were used for daily life and social activities, particularly by women. The thick mud-brick walls provided excellent insulation against the extreme desert heat, while openings and light wells were strategically placed to ensure ventilation and light throughout the dwelling.
