= List of mosques in Libya =

This is a list of mosques in Libya.

== List of mosques ==
Name	Image	Location	Year/century	Remarks
As-Sahabah Mosque		Derna	1975	Attached to the mosque is a cemetery containing the tombs of seventy martyrs who participated in the Battle of Mamma in 688.
Ali bin Abi Talib Mosque		Tobruk		
Atiq Mosque		Benghazi	early 15th century	
Atiq Mosque, Awjila		Awjila	12th century	
Bayat al-Ridwan (بيعة الرضوان)		Benghazi 32.1238378°N 20.0942087°E		Site of extrajudicial executions conducted by Mahmoud al-Werfalli.
Belal ibn Rabah mosque		Benghazi		Also called Ben Kato Mosque
Al Bukhari mosque		Benghazi		
Gamal Abdel Nasser Mosque		Tripoli	2000	Formerly served as the Tripoli Cathedral prior to 2000
Gurgi Mosque		Tripoli	1834	
Karamanli Mosque		Tripoli	1736	
Mawlai muhammad mosque		Tripoli	?	
Sidi Darghut Mosque		Tripoli	1560	
Murad Agha Mosque		Tajura	1550s	

== See also ==
- Islam in Libya
- Lists of mosques
