= Tripoli Tower =

Skyscraper in Tripoli, Libya

Tripoli Tower (Formerly Al Fateh Tower)
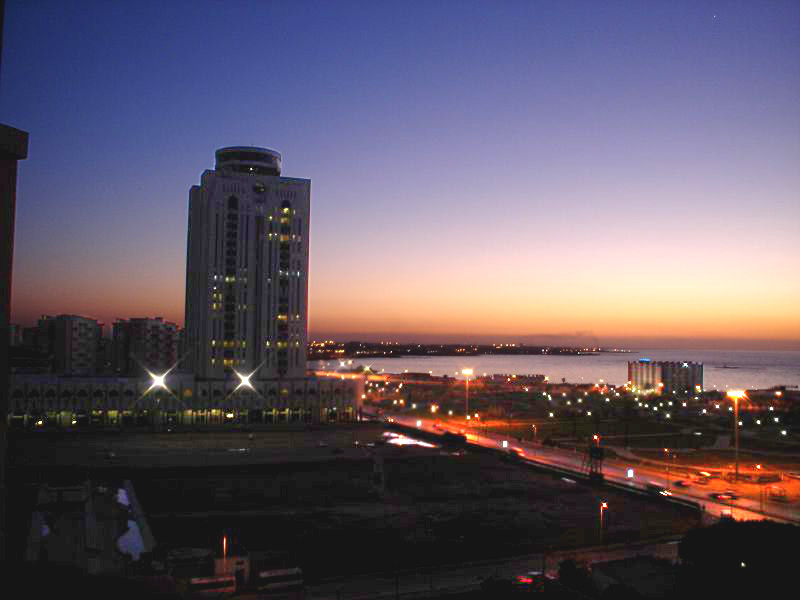
- tripoli tower (al Fateh tower) by night
- Interactive map of the Tripoli Tower (Formerly Al Fateh Tower) area

General information
- Type: Mixed-use
- Location: Tripoli, Libya
- Coordinates: 32.891918°N 13.167125°E
- Opening: 2003

Height
- Roof: 120 m (390 ft)

Technical details
- Floor count: 25

Tripoli Tower (Arabic:برج طرابلس) (Formerly Al Fateh Tower برج الفاتح) is a tower and skyscraper in Tripoli, Libya. It is located in city center of Tripoli, near central business district on Corniche Road. The building was opened in 1999. The tower houses retail outlets, serviced apartments and as well as a boutique hotel with an Oilman's club. The skyscraper has 28 floors and towers at 112 meters. There are four levels of basement car parking.
