= Atiq Mosque, Awjila =

Mosque in Al Wahat, Libya

Atiq Mosque
- Arabic: المسجد العتيق
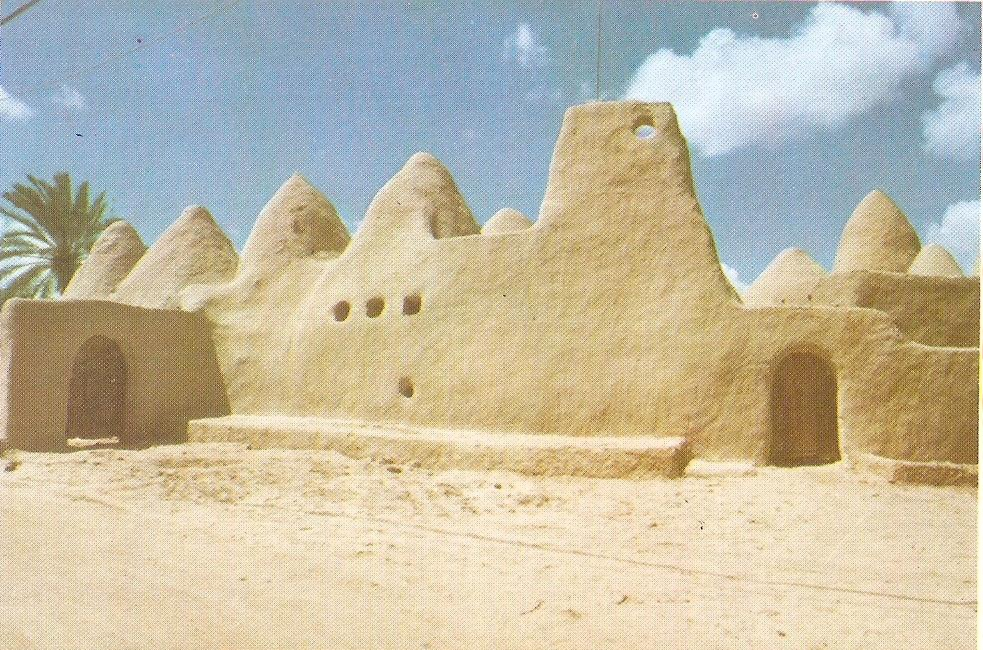
- Exterior of the mosque, c. 1984

- Location of the mosque in Libya

Religion
- Affiliation: Sunni Islam
- Ecclesiastical or organizational status: Mosque
- Status: Active

Location
- Location: Awjila, Sahara, Cyrenaica
- Country: Libya
- Interactive map of Atiq Mosque
- Coordinates: 29°07′39″N 21°17′28″E

Architecture
- Type: Mosque architecture
- Completed: 12th century

Specifications
- Dome: 21
- Materials: Mud brick; limestone

The Atiq Mosque (Arabic: المسجد العتيق, lit. 'old mosque') is a Sunni Islam mosque, located in the oasis village of Awjila, in the Sahara desert of the Cyrenaica region of eastern Libya. The mosque is located in the old city area of Awjila. It dates from the 12th century and has unusual conical domes made of mudbrick and limestone.

== History ==
The region around Awjila was conquered by Arab Muslims under the leadership of Sidi 'Abdullāh ibn Sa'ad ibn Abī as-Sarḥ. His tomb was established in Awjila c. 650 CE. (Note: A modern structure has since replaced Abdullah ibn Saad's original tomb.) The Arab chronicler Al-Bakri says that there were already several mosques around the oasis by the 11th century.

The present Atiq Mosque dates to the 12th century. It was restored in the 1980s.

== Structure ==
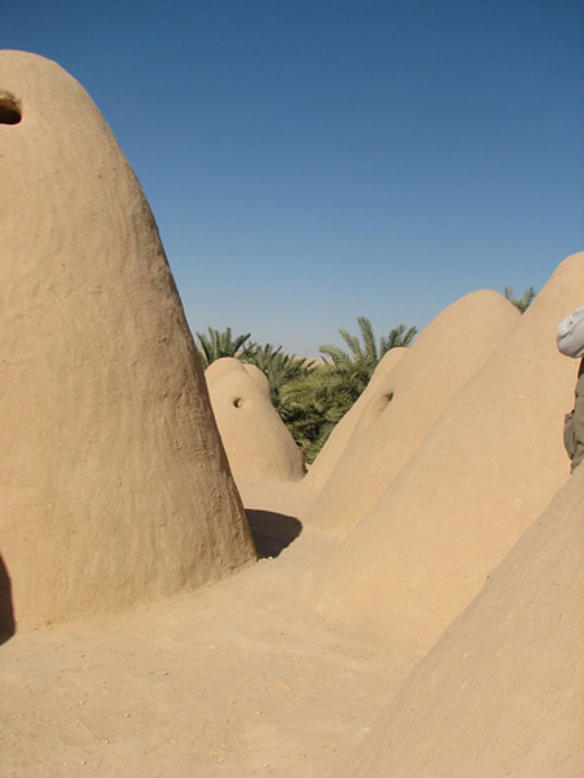
Roof of the Atiq Mosque

The unusual mud brick building covers an area of 400 square metres (4,300 sq ft) and is roofed by 21 conical domes made of mud brick and limestone. Each dome has small openings so that light can enter the building.

The walls are 40 centimetres (16 in) thick. Nine doors lead into the interior of the building, where the many pillars and arches create a spacious, light, cool and calm environment. Beside the mihrab there is a recessed niche for the minbar, where the prayer leader stands. Mosques in Arabia and East Africa have similar minbar niches, which may indicate that the mosque builders followed the Ibadi school of Islam.

== See also ==
- History of Islam in Libya
- List of mosques in Libya
