= Islam in Libya =

Total population
- 7.2 million (2020)

Religions
- Predominantly Sunni Islam, with minorities of Ibadis

Languages
- Liturgical; Quranic Arabic; Common; Libyan Arabic, Berber (Awjila, Nafusi, Tamasheq), Teda

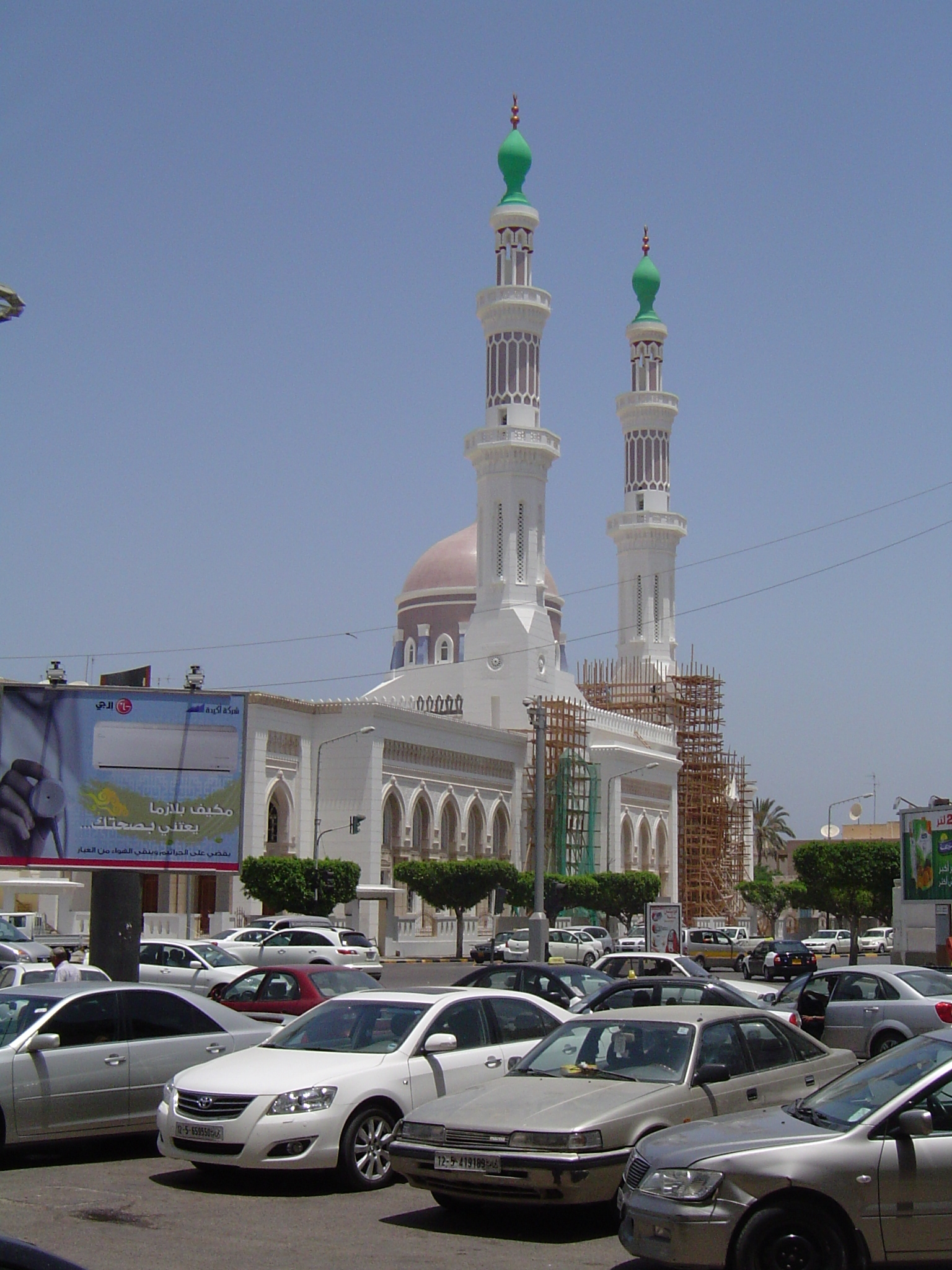
Mawlai Muhammad Mosque, Tripoli

Islam is the dominant religion in Libya, with 97% of Libyans following Sunni Islam. Article 5 of the Libyan Constitution declared that Islam was the official religion of the state. The post-revolution National Transitional Council has explicitly endeavored to reaffirm Islamic values, enhance appreciation of Islamic culture, elevate the status of Quranic law and, to a considerable degree, emphasize Quranic practice in everyday Libyan life with legal implementation in accordance to Islamic jurisprudence known as sharia. Libya has a small presence of Shias, primarily consisting of Pakistani immigrants, though unrecognized by the state.

== History ==
During the seventh century, Muslims, who were spreading their faith, reached Libya and began proselytizing. The urban centers soon became substantially Islamic, but widespread conversion of the nomads of the Sahara did not come until after large-scale invasions in the eleventh century by Bedouin tribes from Arabia and Egypt.

Many pre-Islamic beliefs that had existed in Libya co-mingled with the newly introduced religion. Hence, Islam in Libya became an overlay of Quranic ritual and principles upon the vestiges of earlier beliefs -- prevalent throughout North Africa -- in jinns (spirits), the evil eye, rites to ensure good fortune, and cult veneration of local saints.

=== Islam in Gaddafi's Libya ===
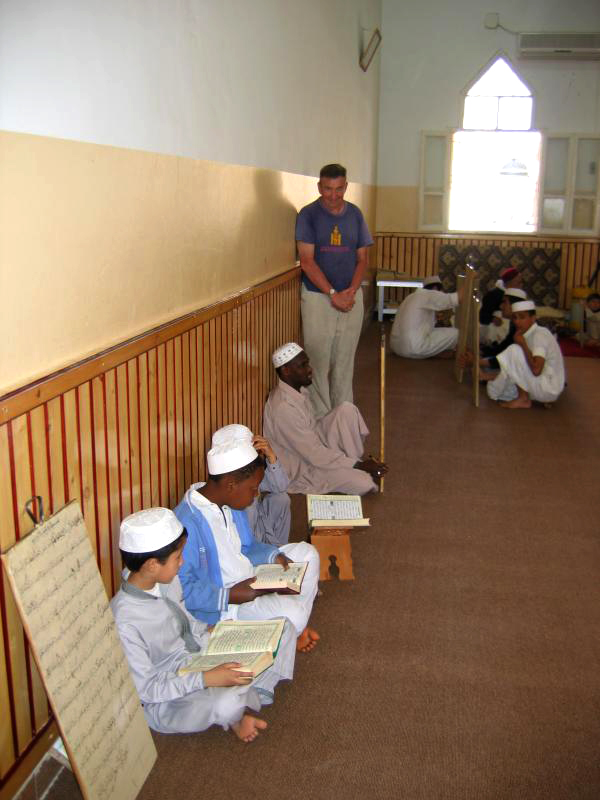
Quran class in Bayda

Under the revolutionary Gaddafi government, the role of orthodox Islam in Libyan life became progressively more important.

Soon after taking office, the Gaddafi government began closing bars and nightclubs, banning entertainment deemed provocative or immodest, and making use of the Islamic calendar mandatory. The intention of reestablishing sharia was announced, and Gaddafi personally assumed chairmanship of a commission to study the problems involved. In November 1973, a new legal code was issued that revised the entire Libyan judicial system to conform to the sharia, and in 1977 the General People's Congress (GPC) issued a statement that all future legal codes would be based on the Quran.

Among the laws enacted by the Gaddafi government were a series of legal penalties prescribed during 1973 which included the punishment of armed robbery by amputation of a hand and a foot. The legislation contained qualifying clauses making its execution unlikely, but its enactment had the effect of applying Quranic principles in the modern era. Another act prescribed flogging for individuals breaking the fast of Ramadan, and yet another called for eighty lashes to be administered to both men and women guilty of fornication.

In the early 1970s, Islam played a major role in legitimizing Gaddafi's political and social reforms. By the end of the decade, however, he had begun to attack the religious establishment and several fundamental aspects of Sunni Islam. Gaddafi asserted the transcendence of the Quran as the sole guide to Islamic governance and the unimpeded ability of every Muslim to read and interpret it. He denigrated the roles of the ulama, imams, and Islamic jurists and questioned the authenticity of the hadith, and thereby the sunna, as a basis for Islamic law. The sharia itself, Gaddafi maintained, governed only such matters as properly fell within the sphere of religion; all other matters lay outside the purview of religious law. Finally, he called for a revision of the Islamic calendar, saying it should date from Muhammad's death in 632, an event he felt was more momentous than the hijra ten years earlier.

The government took a leading role in supporting Islamic institutions and in worldwide proselytizing on behalf of Islam. The Jihad Fund, supported by a payroll tax, was established in 1970 to aid the Palestinians in their struggle with Israel. The Faculty of Islamic Studies and Arabic at the University of Benghazi was charged with training Muslim intellectual leaders for the entire Islamic world, and the Islamic Mission Society used public funds for the construction and repair of mosques and Islamic educational centers in cities as widely separated as Vienna and Bangkok.

== Saints and brotherhoods ==
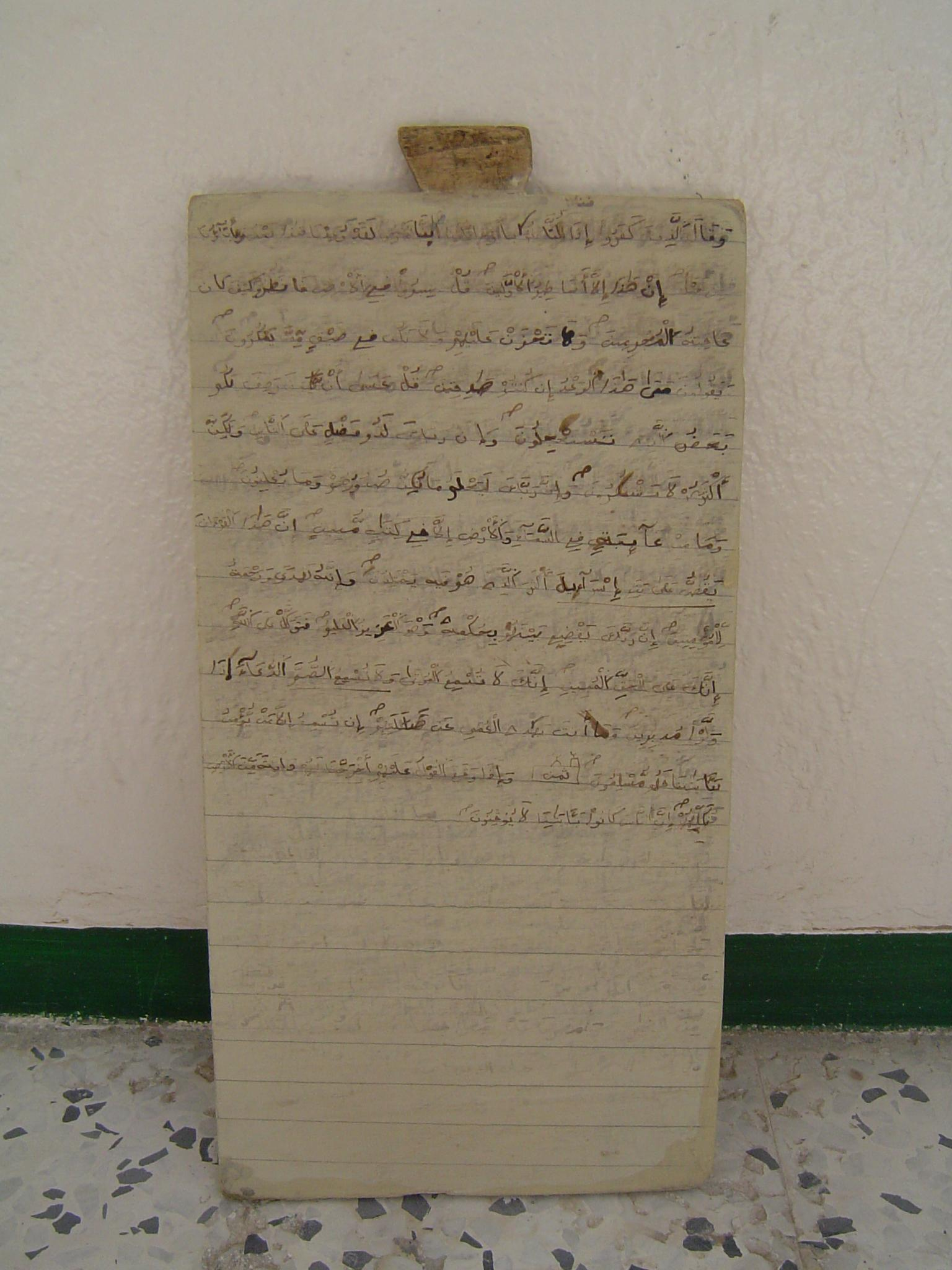
Quran studying board shot in Almayyit Mosque Tripoli. Writing on wooden boards is the traditional method for memorizing Quran

Islam as practiced in North Africa is interlaced with indigenous Berber beliefs. The veneration of saints is widespread in rural areas; in urban localities such as Tripolitania, but they were particularly numerous in Cyrenaica. The number of venerated tombs varied from tribe to tribe, although there tended to be fewer among the camel herders of the desert than among the sedentary and nomadic tribes of the plateau area. In one village, a visitor in the late 1960s counted sixteen still-venerated tombs.

Coteries of disciples frequently clustered around particular saints, especially those who preached a tariqa (devotional "way"). Brotherhoods of the followers of such mystical teachers appeared in North Africa at least as early as the eleventh century and in some cases became mass movements. The founder ruled an order of followers, who were organized under the frequently absolute authority of a leader, or sheikh. The brotherhood was centered on a zawiya.

Sufi adherents gathered into brotherhoods, and Sufi orders became extremely popular, particularly in rural areas. Sufi brotherhoods exercised great influence and ultimately played an important part in the religious revival that swept through North Africa during the eighteenth and nineteenth centuries. In Libya, when the Ottoman Empire proved unable to mount effective resistance to the encroachment of Christian missionaries, the work was taken over by Sufi-inspired revivalist movements. Among these, the most forceful and effective was that of the Senussi, which extended into numerous parts of North Africa.

=== Senusiyya ===
The Senusiyya, or Senussi movement, was a sufi religious revival adapted to desert life. Its zawiyas could be found in Tripolitania and Fezzan, but its influence was strongest in Cyrenaica. The Senusiyya's first theocracy was in the city of Bayda, Cyrenaica and that was their center in 1841. After the Italian occupation, the focus turned from government to seminary education and then to the creation of an Islamic University which became in 1960 the University of Mohammed bin Ali al-Sanusi. The arrival of Gaddafi's rule changed the course of the university. It is now known as the Omar Al-Mukhtar University.

The Senussis formed a nucleus of resistance to the Italian colonization of Libya. As Libyan nationalism fostered by unified resistance to the Italians gained adherents, however, the religious fervor of devotion to the movement began to wane, particularly after the Italians destroyed Senussi religious and educational centers during the 1930s. Nonetheless, Idris of Libya was the grandson of the founder of the Senussi movement, and his status as a Senussi gave him the unique ability to command respect from the disparate parts of the Kingdom of Libya.

Despite its momentary political prominence, the Senussi movement never regained its strength as a religious force after its zawiyas were destroyed. A promised restoration never fully took place, and the Idrisid regime used the Senussi heritage as a means of legitimizing political authority rather than to provide religious leadership.

After unseating Idris in 1969, the revolutionary government placed restrictions on the operation of the remaining zawiyas, appointed a supervisor for Senussi properties, and merged the Senussi-sponsored Islamic University with the University of Libya. The movement was virtually banned, but in the 1980s occasional evidence of Senussi activity was nonetheless reported. Senussi-inspired activists were instrumental in freeing Cyrenaica from Gaddafi's control during the 2011 Libyan Civil War.

== See also ==
- Islam by country
- Religion in Libya
