= Thamusida =

Berber, Carthaginian, and Roman river port in Kenitra, Morocco

- 𐤕𐤌𐤃𐤏𐤕 (Punic)
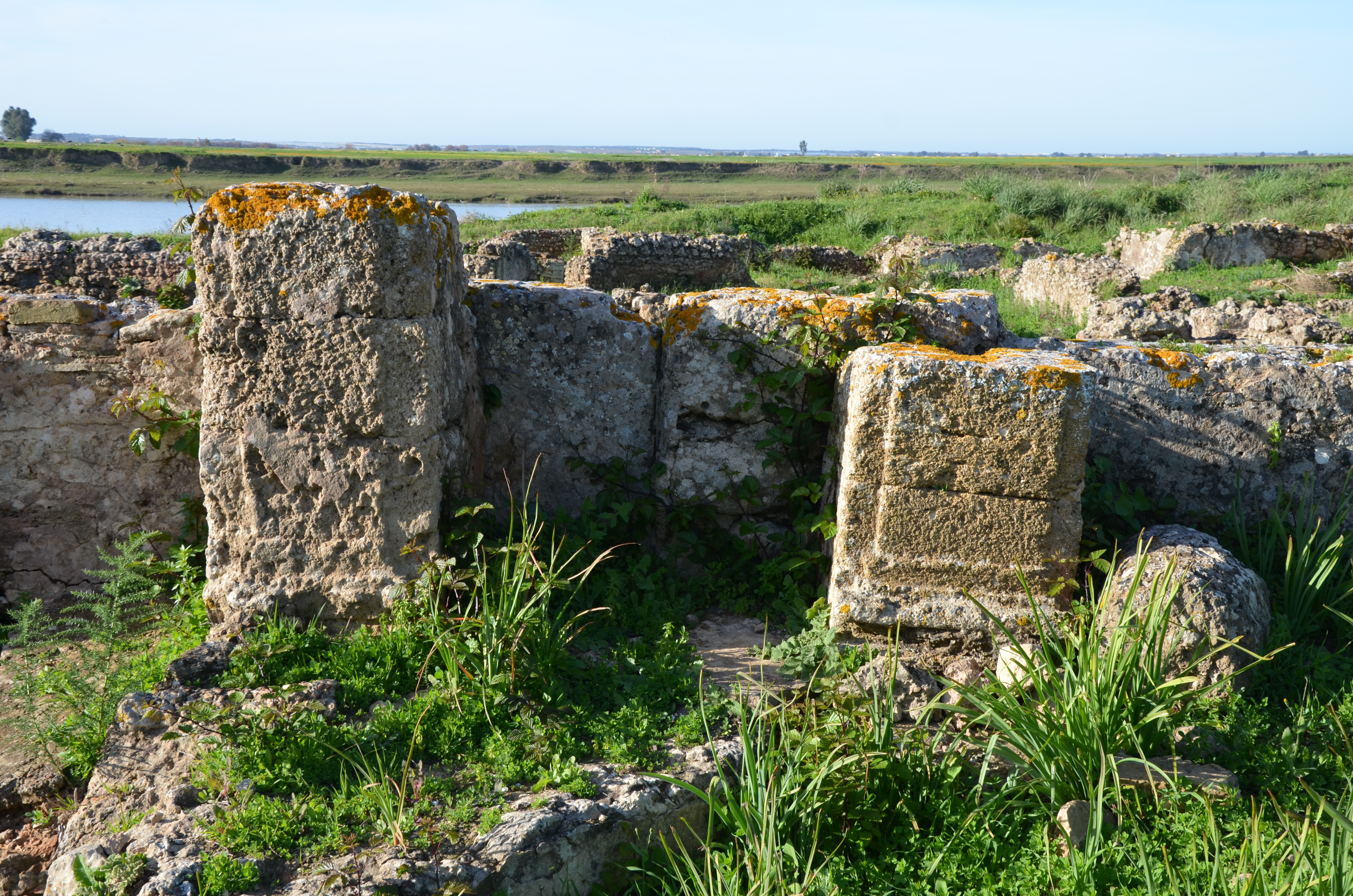
- Thamusida, Mauretania Tingitana, Morocco
- Interactive map of Thamusida
- 34°20′08″N 06°29′22″W
- Type: Ancient Town
- Location: Oulad Slama, Kénitra Province, Rabat-Salé-Kénitra, Morocco

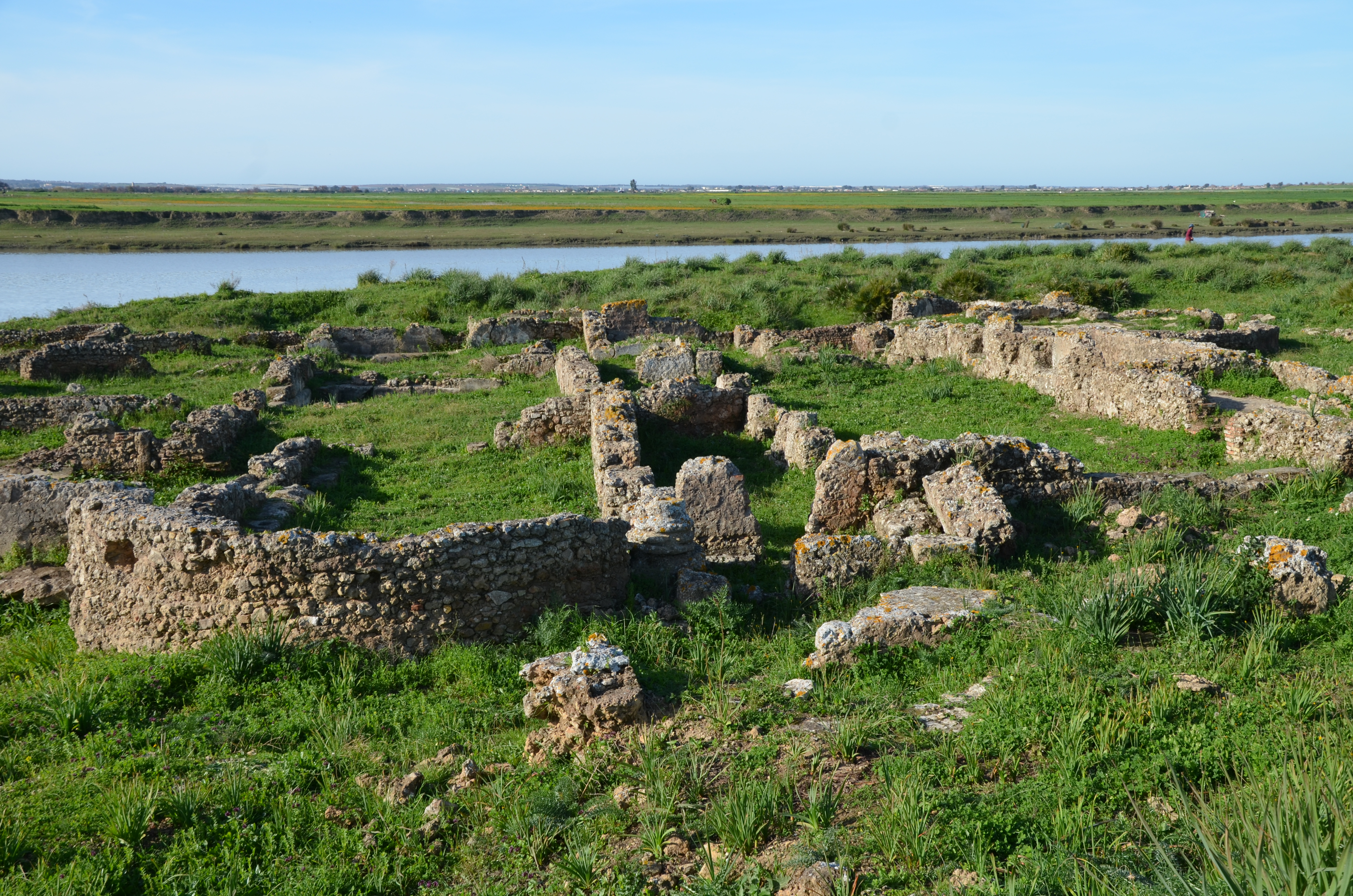
Thamusida, Mauretania Tingitana, Morocco

Thamusida (Punic: 𐤕𐤌𐤃𐤏𐤕) was originally a Punic river port located in the present-day towns of Kénitra and Mehdya in Morocco. Under the Roman Empire, it formed a part of the province of Mauretania Tingitana, and starting in the seventh century it was occupied as part of the Arab conquests. Archaeologically, the site has been studied in several waves, most recently between 1999 and 2006, where excavations focused mainly on Roman and Islamic occupancy and found information mostly regarding the import and local production of food and building supplies.

== Name ==
The Punic form of Thamusida was tmdʿt (𐤕𐤌𐤃𐤏𐤕). Because the original name intended a hard, breathy /tʰ/ sound instead of the usual English /θ/, the same name is also sometimes written Tamusida or Tamusia. It is probably identical with the Thymiateria mentioned by Pseudo-Scylax.

== Archaeology at Thamusida ==
The first occupation of the site dates back to the end of the 7th century BC, during the 1st century AD, Romans settled the area, occupying it until the 3rd century ADE, it was later occupied by people associated with the Arab Conquests starting in the seventh century CE. Thamusida sits near the shrine of Sidi Ali ben Ahmed in Oulad Slama. Rediscovered in the late 1800s, it was excavated on three separate occasions by a French mission between 1930 and 1960. Then, between 1999 and 2006, the University of Siena and the Institut National de Sciences de l’Archéologie et du Patrimoine de Rabat conducted more in-depth excavations.

Most of the archaeology at the site focuses on Roman and Islamic occupation, with archaeologists analyzing charcoal remains to understand food production, plaster wall decorations to understand the economic and artistic situations in the town, and ceramic vessels and bricks to understand architecture and trade.

=== Roman Occupation ===
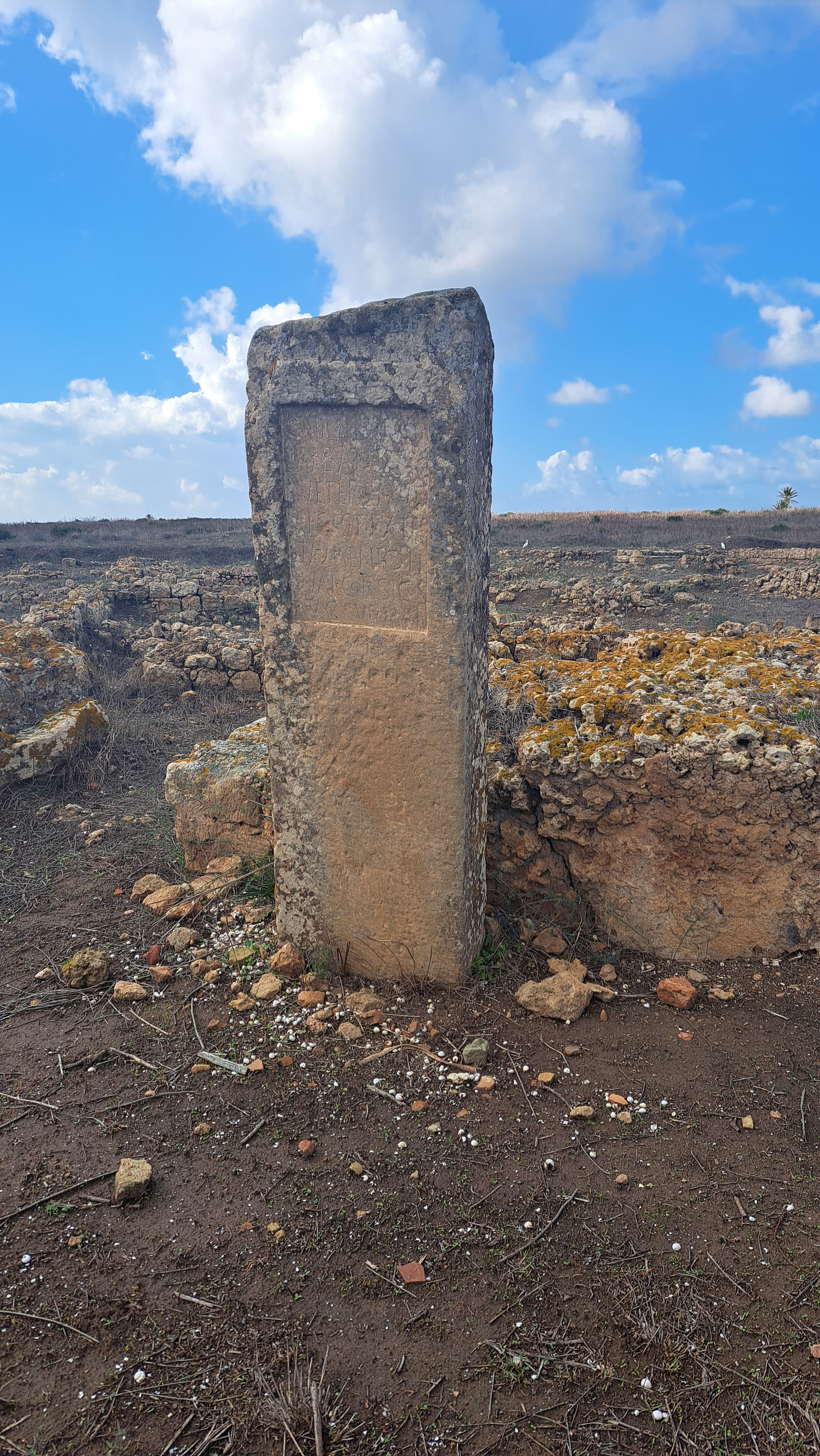
Latin inscription

Thamusida became a Roman settlement in the first century CE, existing as both a complete town, as well as barracks for Roman soldiers in that part of the Roman province of Mauretania Tingitana. After Rome withdrew from the region in the late third century CE, the town remained, although no longer as a military base. Through a variety of archaeological approaches, researchers, most prominently Elisabetta Gliozzo, an Italian archaeologist currently at the University of Florence, have been able to piece together how Thamusida functioned within the Roman Empire, specifically in regards to which resources were produced locally and which were imported from elsewhere in the Empire.

==== Food and Wood Production ====
Through analysis of plant remains, specifically charcoal, researchers have determined how residents of Thamusida likely acquired their supplies and how the town’s economy functioned. By analyzing the charcoal found while excavating the site, archaeologists identified 23 different plants, with cork oaks (Quercus suber) making up the greatest percentage of the assemblage. These trees were likely used for both building and firewood through the entire occupation of the site, as well as by residents using their acorns to feed livestock. Given the current degraded state of the nearby Mamora forest, where the Romans were harvesting these trees, and given the extremely numerous presence of cork oak in the Roman assemblage, researchers have suggested that this might provide evidence for Roman over-exploitation of the trees, something which continues to this day in the area. Beyond cork oak, which numerous evidence suggests was harvested locally, there is also evidence of a few pine trees in the charcoal analysis, which suggests at least some importation of wood as well, since pine does not grow in the area around Thamusida.

Archaeologists also analyzed the charcoal remains of fruits and seeds at the site, determining that crop plants made up most of the assemblage. Specifically, they found that out of 26 plant types identified, 14 were cultivable plants, and among those, cereals, mainly barley and wheat, made up most of the assemblage, although there were also significant numbers of legumes and a few fruit plants. Based on the charcoal remains, Barley seems to have been the main grain people consumed at Thamusida during Roman times, despite Rome’s general dislike for using barley for human consumption. To a lesser extent, they also seem to have consumed naked wheat which was especially prevalent in the military area where their comparatively privileged status might have given them access to better grain. Residents of Thamusida may have used barley so much because it is much hardier than wheat and has a shorter growing season, which made it better equipped to survive in the area. Again based on charcoal analysis, grapes and olive trees also both seem to have been grown in Thamusida, although the limited quantity of olive remains seem to suggest that there were actually very few olive trees growing there, and so people were likely mostly consuming the fruits fresh, although some oil production is probable. Because of this, the people at Thamusida probably imported most of their olive oil. Similarly, the limited number of grapes in the area were also most likely for fresh eating, with most wine being imported as well. Overall, Thamusida during Roman occupation seems to have been mostly self-sufficient, with residents consuming mostly locally grown food and using mostly local timber, while importing some staples such as oil and wine.

==== Plaster and Pigments ====
During the Roman occupation of Thamusida, painted plasters, mostly frescoes, were common, with archaeologists having found them in public, private, and religious buildings. These plasters are of varying quality and style, with some having colorful, geometric designs, some imitating marble, and others being predominantly solid colors. By analyzing thin slices of them with optical microscopy and scanning electron microscopy, archaeologists determined the general makeup of the plasters, allowing them to draw additional conclusions about their production and the materials Romans used to make them. For the most part, researchers found that the plaster was applied in three layers with each subsequent layer having a smaller grain size and therefore a smoother surface to receive pigment, suggesting that artisans were sieving the material they used to make the plaster itself. These layers consisted of a base layer to prepare the wall, a middle layer, and a thin top layer to which the pigments were applied, mostly in a fresco style. In addition to understanding the techniques of their creation, archaeologists’ analysis of these plasters allowed them to determine that they were made using local sands and clays, which they were able to do by comparing the mineral makeup of the plasters to the mineral makeup of the surrounding area.

On these plasters, analysts identified a variety of pigments, including bright red made of cinnabar, dark red from red ochre, yellow from yellow ochre, and blue from Egyptian blue which included tin, gold, and copper, green from either celadonite or glauconite, carbon black from carbonized plant matter, and white from calcite. In an interesting illustration of change over time, red from cinnabar is present in the earlier structures at Thamusida but not the later ones, reflecting the trend across the Roman provinces of replacing cinnabar with red ochre starting in the first century CE. Cinnabar was very expensive, imported to the rest of the Roman world from Spain, and its prohibitive cost may have been part of why Romans began to shift away from it, but its presence in some of the buildings at Thamusida points towards relative affluence for at least some residents of the town. With that said, the earlier buildings at Thamusida which do have cinnabar red have it over top of a coat of red ochre, perhaps to protect the pigment from the destructive lime in the plaster, or perhaps to allow for the use of less of the expensive pigment.

==== Ceramics and Bricks ====
There is evidence for both Roman and Islamic era pottery production facilities at Thamusida. For the Roman artifacts, archaeologists used typology to date several bottles and a jug to between the Claudian and Flavian dynasties, as well as a stewpot to the mid second century CE. Then, using thermoluminescence dating, several types of microscopy, and analysis of the minerals in the artifacts, archaeologists analyzed them again, discovering dates which generally corroborated their typological assignments, although this analysis led to the discovery of some pottery pieces from the eighteenth century CE as well. Based on their mineralogical makeup, it seems that some of these ceramics were produced in Thamusida, while the rest were likely made somewhere nearby.

In a study analyzing both Roman and Islamic era bricks, archaeologists collected forty bricks from Thamusida’s settlement which dated to Roman occupation. Many of the Roman era bricks they collected were stamped with makers’ marks which they were able to use in conjunction with a variety of analysis techniques to learn more about Roman presence at the site. In dividing the bricks into categories based on their mineralogical makeup, these researchers found that not only did these divisions fall mostly along production lines, but also many of the Roman bricks were made at or near Thamusida. Not all of the bricks were made locally, however, such as those stamped with C∞ which dated to the end of the first century CE, the same time as the Roman barracks were being constructed in Thamusida, and because of this fact, as well as their mineralogical makeup, were likely imported from modern day Tangier. Similarly, the bricks which read HADRIAVG, a stamp which classifies them as having been made in an imperial workshop, cannot mineralogically have been made at Thamusida. These too were likely imported from modern day Tangier, a distance which implies that the residents of Thamusida were involved in maritime trade. Meanwhile bricks stamped QAP were found both at Thamusida and in a nearby territory which would only be possible via river trade. Thus, this analysis of bricks shows that Roman residents of Thamusida were engaging in both maritime and fluvial trade, using both locally produced and imported bricks.

==== Glass ====
The French excavations in the 1930s and ‘60s at Thamusida found a significant number of glass window panes, waste glass, and vessels, and archaeologists analyzed these in the early 2010s in an attempt to understand more about the site, analyzing both local sand and the artifacts to determine their chemical makeup. The glass artifacts at Thamusida range in color from green, blue, and grayish, to yellow, and colorless. The waste glass, meanwhile, is very twisted but unburned, suggesting that some sort of local intentional glass modification created it. Although it is not possible to know for certain whether the glass artifacts at Thamusida were made locally or imported, because the mineralogical makeup of the local sand is not conducive to glass making, it seems likely that glass was not being primarily produced at Thamusida, although the presence of waste glass might suggest that pre-made glass was being modified locally.

=== Islamic Occupation ===
The Islamic presence in Morocco started in 683 CE, and although most archaeological work at Thamusida focuses on the Roman era of occupation, there has been some analysis of artifacts from Islamic occupation, which show that they were producing ceramics and bricks locally, either at or near Thamusida.

==== Ceramics and Bricks ====
Archaeologists have analyzed several common ware ceramics at Thamusida which likely belong to the Islamic occupation of the site, including a cup, a basin, and several jugs. Analysts’ typological dating of them ranges between the sixth and eleventh centuries CE, and much like the analysis of the Roman era ceramics, absolute dating techniques generally corroborate these dates. Mineralogical makeup of the Islamic era ceramics also suggests that they were produced in or near Thamusida.

Archaeologists have found remains of an Islamic era ceramic workshop with at least four kilns dating to the late eight or early ninth centuries CE just outside of Thamusida’s walls. In a study analyzing both Roman and Islamic bricks at Thamusida, archaeologists looked at twenty seven bricks from this workshop. Using a variety of analytical techniques, they divided the bricks into categories based on their mineralogical makeup, finding that nearly all of the bricks had a fine texture and low porosity, and their mineralogical makeup was largely based on quartz and calcite no matter what category they were in. By comparing this makeup to samples of local sediments, archaeologists found that the bricks from the Islamic ceramics workshop were made using local clay.

== History ==
Thamusida was used as a Carthaginian trading post and was about 48 kilometers (30 mi) from Shalat (the Roman Sala and modern Chellah). It issued its own bronze coins. Some Punic inscriptions were found in the site.

It was occupied by Romans in the first years of Augustus' rule. There were a military camp and a nearby little city, until Claudius enlarged Thamusida. According to historian Stefano Camporeale, the auxiliary unit that built the Roman camp in Thamusida was probably the Cohors secunda Syrorum civium Romanorum in the second half of the first century (ceramic evidence confirms this chronology): this camp (with annexed "vicus") was one of the largest camps of the whole province of Mauretania Tingitana and measured about 2 hectares (4.9 acres). Under the Antonines, a temple was built to worship Venus. Later the settlement grew progressively, and by the end of the second century or the early third century, it was surrounded by a wall that included a total area of about 15 hectares.

During the reign of Claudius, strengthened structures multiply in Thamusida. It probably sheltered an active port to which testify the many remains of Amphoras, and became a point of unloading and a Roman supply centre. Under the Flavians, a Roman military garrison remained on the spot. The city gave signs of growth; a temple was raised (the Temple with embossing), as well as thermal baths and dwelling houses including one with a central court. Under Trajan or Hadrian, a new structuring of urban space seemed to take place by conferring to the city an orthogonal urbanism plan with thermal baths and a small temple dedicated to Venus-Astarte. The development and the enrichment of the city conveyed in the continuing enlarging and transformation of the river thermal baths, in the construction of new temples bordering the bank of Sebou river and in new dwellings such as the "House of Pavement" which adopted the plan of the rich residences of Volubilis and Spain. Modest houses, workshops and utility buildings occupied many districts. In addition to its commercial and industrial functions which are behind its development, the town of Thamusida was to play a significant military role. It was populated by veterans and under Marcus Aurelius was built the most imposing fortress of Tingitane so to ensure the protection of the civilian population. Under Commodus or Septimius Severus, an enclosure was built and which reemployed funerary steles and crushed a part of the pavement house, that indicated the fact that the work was dictated by the fear of a close or remote danger. In the 3rd century, the city was always active as showed the extent of the river thermal baths and the density of the ceramic founds is the spot until occurred the final abandonment which took place between 274 and 285, but it was not known if it was due to the departure of the Army or to a posterior cause. Scattered finds and some walls of Thamusida attested of a ephemeral occupation posterior to the date of evacuation.

— Mark Ellingham

In the third century, Thamusida become a mostly Christian city with a population of nearly 7,000 inhabitants. The site was abandoned around AD 285, when Diocletian moved the Roman limes of Mauretania Tingitana to the north, near Lixus. There were some inhabitants—according to recent archeological discoveries—in Thamusida for another century after the Roman abandonment. But with the Vandal invasion, the city disappeared around AD 425.

== See also ==
- Iulia Valentia Banasa
- Iulia Constantia Zilil
- Iulia Campestris Babba
- Tamuda
- Tingis
- Lixus
- Sala Colonia
- Volubilis
- Roman 'Coloniae' in Berber Africa
- Christian Berbers
- Mauretania Tingitana
