= List of Roman colonies =

List of cities that had Colonia status in the Roman Empire, arranged according to the modern day country they are in:

== List ==
=== Albania ===
- Buthrotum
- Byllis - Colonia Bullidensis
- Dyrrhachium

=== Algeria ===
- Auzia - Colonia Septima Aurelia Auziense
- Caesarea
- Cartenna - Colonia Augusti
- Chullu
- Cirta - Colonia Julia Juvenalis Honoris et Virtutis Cirta
- Cuicul
- Gunugus
- Hippo Regius
- Icosium
- Igilgili
- Madauros - Colonia Flavia Augusta Veteranorum Madaurensium
- Milevum - Colonia Sarnensis Milevitana
- Oppidum Novum
- Rusazu
- Rusguniae
- Rusicade
- Saldae
- Setifis - Colonia Augusta Nerviana Martialis Veteranorum Sitifensium
- Tipasa - Colonia Aelia Augusta Tipasensium
- Thamugadi
- Theveste
- Thubursicum
- Tubusuctu - Colonia Iulia Augusta Legionis VII
- Zucchabar - Colonia Iulia Augusta Zucchabar

=== Austria ===
- Carnuntum
- Ovilava

=== Bosnia and Herzegovina ===
- Domavia

=== Bulgaria ===
- Deultum
- Oescus
- Ratiaria - Colonia Ulpia Traiana Ratiaria
- Serdica
- Ulpia Oescensium - Colonia Ulpia Oescensium

=== Croatia ===
- Aequum
- Cibalae
- Iader
- Mursa
- Narona
- Parentium
- Pola
- Salona - Colonia Martia Iulia Valeria Salona Felix
- Siscia

=== France ===
- Aleria
- Apollinaris Reiorum
- Apta Iulia
- Aquae Sextiae
- Arausio
- Arelate
- Avennio
- Baeterrae
- Carcasso
- Carpentoracte
- Dea Augusta
- Elusa
- Forum Segusiavorum
- Forum Iulii
- Glanum
- Lugdunum - Colonia Copia Claudia Augusta Lugdunum
- Lugdunum Convenarum
- Luteva
- Mariana
- Narbo - Colonia Claudia Iulia Paterna Narbo Martius
- Nemausus
- Noviomagus Tricastinorum
- Ruscino
- Valentia
- Vienna

=== Germany ===
- Augusta Treverorum
- Colonia Claudia Ara Agrippinensium
- Colonia Ulpia Traiana
- Noviomagus Nemetum

=== Greece ===
- Cassandrea
- Cnossos - Colonia Iulia Nobilis Cnosos
- Corinth - Colonia Laus Iulia Corinthus
- Dium
- Pathrae
- Pella
- Philippoi

=== Hungary ===
- Aquincum - Colonia Septimia Aquincensium
- Brigetio
- Savaria

=== Iraq ===
- Singara

=== Israel ===
- Aelia Capitolina (Jerusalem)
- Caesarea Maritima
- Diospolis
- Ptolomais Akko

=== Italy ===
- Abellinum
- Aecae
- Aeclanum
- Aesis
- Alba Fucens
- Allifae
- Alsium
- Antium
- Aquileia
- Ardea
- Ariminum
- Arretium - Colonia Iulia Arretinorum
- Asculum
- Ateste
- Adria
- Augusta Taurinorum
- Auximum
- Beneventum
- Bovianum
- Bononia
- Brixia
- Canusium
- Capua
- Carseoli
- Casinum
- Castrum Novum
- Catana
- Circeii
- Cosa
- Cremona
- Dertona
- Falerii
- Falerio Picenus
- Fanum Fortunae
- Firmum Picenum
- Florentia
- Formiae
- Hadria
- Hasta
- Hipponium
- Hispellum
- Iulium Carnicum
- Lanuvium
- Larinum
- Lilybaeum
- Liternum
- Luceria
- Lucus Feroniae
- Luna
- Mediolanum
- Minturnae
- Mutina
- Neapolis
- Nola
- Nuceria Alfaterna
- Nursia
- Ostia
- Paestum
- Panormus
- Parma
- Perusia
- Placentia
- Pisaurum
- Pompeii - Colonia Veneria Cornelia Pompeianorum
- Portus Pisanus
- Praeneste
- Privernum
- Puteoli - Colonia Neronensis Claudia Augusta Puteoli
- Ricina
- Rusellae
- Saena Iulia
- Salernum
- Scolacium
- Setia
- Sinuessa
- Sipontum
- Sora
- Suessa Aurunca
- Tarracina
- Teanum Sidicinum
- Telesia
- Theate Marrucinorum
- Thermae Himeraeae
- Tolentinum
- Tuder
- Turris Libisonis
- Tyndaris
- Urbana
- Urbs Salvia
- Uselis
- Venafrum
- Venusia
- Verona
- Vibinum
- Volaterrae

=== Jordan ===
- Petra

=== Lebanon ===
- Arca
- Berytus
- Heliopolis
- Sidon
- Tyrus

=== Libya ===
- Leptis Magna
- Oea

=== Morocco ===
- Babba
- Banasa
- Lixus
- Sala
- Tingis
- Volubilis
- Zili

=== North Macedonia ===
- Scupi

=== Portugal ===
- Pax Iulia
- Scalabis

=== Romania ===
- Apulum
- Drobeta
- Napoca
- Potaissa
- Romula
- Sarmizegetusa

=== Serbia ===
- Bassianae
- Singidunum
- Sirmium
- Viminacium

=== Slovenia ===
- Emona
- Poetovio

=== Spain ===
- Acci
- Aelia Italica
- Asido
- Astigi
- Barcino
- Carteia
- Carthago Nova
- Caesaraugusta
- Celsa
- Clunia
- Corduba
- Emerita Augusta
- Flaviobriga
- Hispalis
- Ilici
- Iliturgis
- Ituci Virtus Iulia (Torreparedones)
- Iulia Traducta
- Libisosa
- Metellinum
- Norba Caesarina
- Salaria
- Tarraco - Colonia Iulia Urbs Triumphalis Tarraconensium
- Tucci
- Ucubi
- Urso
- Valentia

=== Switzerland ===
- Augusta Raurica
- Aventicum
- Noviodunum

=== Syria ===
- Bosra
- Dura-Europos
- Emesa
- Laodiceia ad Mare
- Palmyra
- Philippopolis in Arabia
- Rhesaina

=== Turkey ===
- Antigonia
- Antiochia Pisidia
- Apamea
- Aprus
- Archelais
- Carrhae
- Claudiopolis
- Coloneia
- Comama
- Cremna
- Faustinopolis
- Germa
- Iconium
- Lystra
- Mallus
- Nicomedia
- Nisibis
- Olba
- Olbasa
- Parium
- Parlais
- Sinop
- Tyana

=== Tunisia ===
- Abitinae
- Ammaedara
- Assura
- Bulla Regia
- Capsa
- Carpis
- Carthage - Colonia Concordia Iulia Carthago
- Cillium
- Curubis
- Hadrumetum
- Hippo Diarrhytus
- Lares
- Mactaris
- Neapolis
- Pupput
- Sicca Veneria
- Simitthus
- Sufes
- Tacapae
- Thabarca
- Thaenae
- Thapsus
- Thelepte
- Thuburbo Majus
- Thuburbo Minus
- Thuburnica
- Thugga
- Thysdrus
- Uchi Maius
- Uthina
- Vaga
- Vallitanus
- Zama

=== United Kingdom ===
- Camulodunum
- Eboracum
- Glevum
- Lindum

== See also ==
- Local government (ancient Roman)
- Colonies in antiquity
- Municipium
- Civitas
