= Roman roads in Morocco =

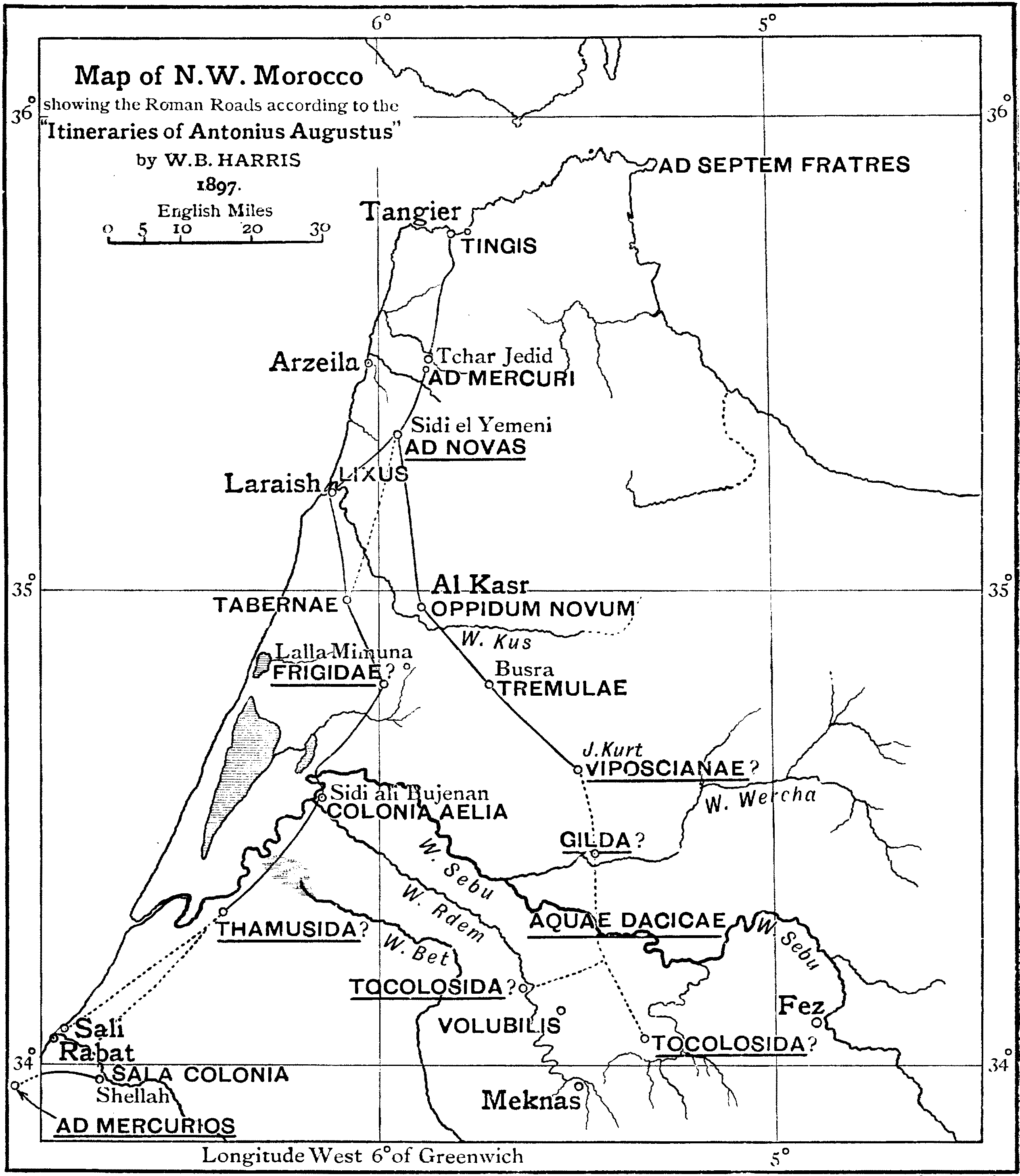
Late-19th-century reconstruction of Roman roads in Morocco. Aelia = Iulia Valentia Banasa (for a more recent map, look under External links)

Roman roads in Morocco were the western roads of Roman Africa.

== Characteristics ==
In 42 AD, the western part of the kingdom of Mauretania was reorganized as a province of Rome Mauretania Tingitana. During the reign of emperor Claudius (41–54) infrastructure was improved.

A road leading in the southern direction from Tingis split in two at Ad Mercuri (possibly modern Bled Mers).

One of the two followed the Atlantic coast through Iulia Constantia Zilil (Dchar Jdid), Lixus (Larache) and Sala Colonia (near Rabat).

The other, more to the east, ended in Tocolosida, near Volubilis and modern Fez.

There is the possibility that a Roman road was built toward south, from Sala Colonia to Anfa (or Anfus), in the area of modern Casablanca, where there was a small port used by the Phoenicians and later the Romans since 15 BC. This port was used for Roman expeditions toward the Canary Islands.

There was another important road that connected Mauretania Tingitana with Mauretania Caesariensis (modern western Algeria). It ran from Tamuda to Numerus Syrorum.

Main Roman roads in western north Africa

== See also ==
- Roman roads in Africa

== Sources ==
- M. Euzennat. 1962. "Les voies romaines du Maroc dans l' Itineraire d' Antonin," Hommages à Albert Grenier (Brussels) vol. II, 595-610.
