= Olbasa (disambiguation) =

Olbasa may refer to:

- Olbasa (Cilicia), another name for Olba, a town of ancient Cilicia
- Olbasa (Lycaonia), a town of ancient Lycaonia
- Olbasa (Pisidia), a town of ancient Pisidia
