= Roman colonies in North Africa =

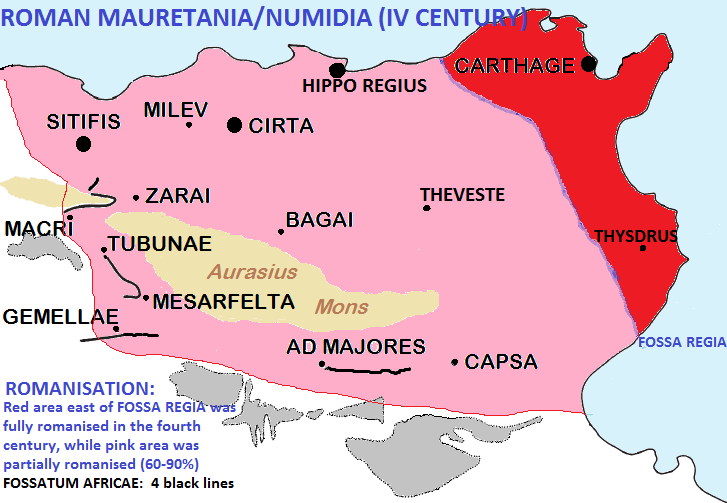
The Fossa regia marked the border between the original Roman province of Africa and Numidia. East of Fossa Regia (area in red) there was full Latinisation. Most of the Romano-berber colonies were in the areas in red and pink.

Roman colonies in North Africa are the cities—populated by Roman citizens—created in North Africa by the Roman Empire, mainly in the period between the reigns of Augustus and Trajan.

== Characteristics ==
Since the second half of the first century BC and as a result of increasing communities of Roman citizens living in the North African centers, Rome started to create colonies in North Africa. The main reason was to control the area with Roman citizens, who had been legionaries in many cases. The second reason was to give land and urban properties to the Roman military troops who had fought for the Roman Empire and so decrease the demographic problem in the Italian peninsula. The third reason was to facilitate the Romanization of the area and so the integration of the local Berbers -through marriage and other relationships in the Roman Empire's social and cultural world.

It is indicative that two of the main characteristics of the Roman world, Latin language and Christianity, were increased to nearly full acceptance by the Berber autochthonous population (from nearly zero at the times of Augustus) after the four centuries of Roman dominance in what is now called Maghreb: this was done even through the creation and development of the Roman colonies, according to historian Theodore Mommsen.

Indeed, under Theodosius I the area east of the Fossa Regia was fully Romanized with one third of the population made of Italian colonists and their descendants, according to historian Theodore Mommsen. The other two thirds were Romanized Berbers, who were all Christians and nearly all Latin speaking.

Furthermore, in the same century in the area between Fossa Regia and the Fossatum Africae of the Roman limes, which was expanded -further west of the Fossa Regia- the process of Romanization after Augustus, the Roman colonists and descendants were nearly 20% of the population. They were concentrated around Cirta with surrounding confederated cities and around Thamugadi in the Aures region, while the remaining 80% was made of Berbers of whom only 25% were not fully assimilated and still spoke autochthonous Berber languages. Nearly all of them worshipped Christianity (and a few even Judaism).

The prosperity of most towns depended on agriculture. Called the "Granary of the Empire", Romano-Berber North Africa produced one million tons of cereals each year, one-quarter of which was exported. Additional crops included beans, figs, grapes, and other fruits. By the second century, olive oil rivalled cereals as an export item. In addition to the cultivation of slaves, and the capture and transporting of exotic wild animals, the principal production and exports included textiles, marble, wine, timber, livestock, pottery such as African Red Slip, and wool. Also the southern areas -facing the Sahara desert- enjoyed a farm & urban development, even if modest.

The incorporation of colonial cities into the Roman Empire brought an unparalleled degree of urbanization to vast areas of territory, particularly in North Africa. This level of rapid urbanization had a structural impact on the town economy, and artisan production in Roman cities became closely tied to the agrarian spheres of production. As Rome's population grew, so did her demand for North African produce. This flourishing trade allowed the North African provinces to increase artisan production in rapidly developing cities, making them highly organized urban centers. Many Roman cities shared both consumer and producer model city aspects, as artisanal activity was directly related to the economic role cities played in long-distance trade networks.

The urban population became increasingly engaged in the craft and service sectors and less in agrarian employment even in Byzantine times,[6] until a significant portion of the town's vitality came from the sale or trade of products through middlemen to markets in areas both rural and abroad. The changes that occurred in the infrastructure for agricultural processing, like olive oil and wine production, as trade continued to develop both cities and commerce directly influenced the volume of artisan production. The scale, quality, and demand for these products reached its acme in Roman North Africa.

Berber Africa – from northern Morocco to Tripolitania – had a population of more than 3 million inhabitants in the third century, according to historian Hilario Gomez, and nearly 40% were living in more than 500 cities. But in the sixth century – after the Byzantine reconquest – the population was reduced to less than 2.5 million and after the Arab conquest in the eighth to tenth centuries there remained only one million (nearly all living in the countryside, with the Arab newly founded capital Kairouan having just 30,000 inhabitants). Roman northwestern Africa with its cities and civilization had practically disappeared in just two centuries of Arab domination.

== Different kinds of colonies ==
Roman coloniae were of two kinds: Roman and Latin; the first and most important were the Roman coloniae that characterized by full rights of Roman citizenship. Then there were the municipia and finally the civitates peregrinae (meaning foreign cities or not Roman populated cities). Romans called municipia their normal administrative entities in the empire.

The citizens of municipia of the first order held full Roman citizenship and their rights (civitas optimo iure) included the right to vote, which was the ultimate right in Rome and a sure sign of full rights. In many case these cities had reduced or even no tax duties. The second order of municipia comprised important tribal centres which had come under Roman control. Residents of these did not become full Roman citizens (although their magistrates could become so after retirement). They were given the duties of full citizens in terms of liability to taxes and military service, but not all of the rights; most significantly, they had no right to vote.

== List of the main Roman colonies ==
There were 40 cities in the territory of actual Tunisia with the title and privileges of Roman coloniae or similar, while in Algeria there is more than 80, Morocco and Libya only a few. The most important was the "capital" new Carthago, with more than 300,000 inhabitants during Septimius Severus times (who enhanced Leptis Magna – where he was born – to be the second city of Berber Africa with nearly 100,000 inhabitants). According to historian De Ruggiero in his famous Dizionario epigrafico di antichita' romane, some of the most well known Roman Colonia in Berber Africa were:

State	Roman Colony
Africa Preconsularis	Assuras; Carpis; Carthago; Curubis; Neapolis; Simithu; Thuburnica; Madaure; Thubursicum Numidiae; Zama
Numidia	Cirta; Constantina; Vescera; Arsacal; Russicada; Tiddis; Verecunda; Cuicul; Masculla; Thamugadi; Theveste; Saldae; Setifis; Auzia; Lambaesis; Igilgili; Gemellae; Ad Medias
Mauretania Caesariensis	Caesarea; Sigus; Rapidum; Cohors Breucorum; Altava; Castellum Dimiddi; Icosium; Cartenna; Oppidum Novum; Rusguniae; Portus Magnus, Algeria; Pomaria; Tipasa; Castellum Tigintanum; Auzia; Imonium
Mauretania Tingitana	Volubilis; Lixus; Tingis; Banasa; Babba; Zilil.
Tripolitania	Leptis Magna

Following is a list of some of the main and most important Roman coloniae:

- Caesarea (Cherchell in Algeria): Caesarea was made capital of Mauretania Caesariensis, when promoted to "Colonia Claudia Caesarea" in 48 AD by Claudius
- Carthago (Cartage in ancient Tunisia): On the soil of destroyed Carthage, Roman Carthage was founded as "Colonia Junona" in 122 BC and refounded by Caesar in 45 BC. It was the "capital" of Roman Africa, with more than 300,000 inhabitants, and was fully destroyed by Arabs in 698 AD (who later founded nearby actual "Tunis")
- Cirta (Constantine in Algeria): Cirta was renamed by Costantine I: "Civitas Constantina Cirtensium". It was surrounded by a "Confederation of free Roman cities" (Tiddis, Cuicul, etc.)
- Hadrumetum (Sousa in Tunisia): Hadrumetum was made by Trajan "Colonia Concordia Ulpia Trajana Augusta Frugifera Hadrumetina" and was the second biggest city in Berber Africa. It was destroyed -after a two-month siege- by Arabs and only one century later recreated as "Sousse".
- Hippo Regius (Bone in Algeria): Hyppo Regius -called even Hippona- was the city of Saint Augustine of Hippo. It was very rich and fully Romanized. It was destroyed by the Arabs, but Byzantines & berbers rebuilt it and now is part of the nearby city of Annaba, which was built in the eighth century.
- Leptis Magna (Leptis Magna in Roman Libya): Leptis magna was made Municipia by Trajan in 109 AD with the name "Ulpia Trajana" and Colonia by Septimius Severus in 200 AD
- Setifis (Setif in Algeria): Founded by Roman Emperor Nero in 96 AD, it was the site of many famous historical battles in Roman North Africa Including the wars of the Triumvurate, the city is considered today the commercial capital of Algeria.
- Sala Colonia (Chellah in Morocco): Sala Colonia was a Roman colony until the end of the third century. The city remained with a Roman garrison until the sixth century and now is part of metropolitan Rabat.
- Thamugadi (Timgad in Algeria): Timgad was founded by Trajan in 100 AD as "Colonia Marciana Ulpia Traiana Thamugadi"
- Thysdrus (El Djem in Tunisia): Thysdrus was made "colonia" in 244 AD by Gordian III
- Volubilis (Volubilis in ancient Morocco): Volubilis was made Colonia ("Municipium") by Claudius around 50 AD. It was abandoned by Romans in 285 AD, but survived autonomously until the eighth century

== See also ==
- Roman colonies
- List of Roman colonies

== Bibliography ==
- Adkins, L. and R.A. Adkins, “Coloniae”, in L. Adkins and R.A. Adkins, Handbook to Life in Ancient Rome, New York, 1994.
- Bullo, Silvia. Provincia Africa: le città e il territorio dalla caduta di Cartagine a Nerone. Editore L'Erma di Bretschneider. Roma, 2002 ISBN 8882651681
- Bunson, M. “Colonies, Roman”, in M. Bunson, Encyclopedia of the Roman Empire, New York, 1994.
- De Ruggiero, Ettore. Dizionario epigrafico di antichita romane. Vol. I-IV. Ed. University of Michigan. Chicago, 1924 Vol. II
- Gomez, Hilario. Ciudades de Bizancio. Las ciudades del Africa Romano-Bizantina. Editorial Sirius. Madrid, 2007
- Laffi, Umberto. Colonie e municipi nello Stato romano Ed. di Storia e Letteratura. Roma, 2007 ISBN 8884983509
- Lendering, Jona. Coloniae. Livius.org (2006)
- Mommsen, Theodore. The Provinces of the Roman Empire Section: Roman Africa. (Leipzig 1865; London 1866; London: Macmillan 1909; reprint New York 1996) Barnes & Noble. New York, 1996
- Nacéra Benseddik. De Caesarea à Shershel, Actes du IIe Coll. Intern. sur l’Hist. et l’Arch. de l’Afrique du Nord, Grenoble 1983, C.T.H.S., 19b, 1983, p. 451-456.
- Pringle D, Reginald. Sixth-century Fortifications in Byzantine Africa. An Archaeological and Historical Study Oxford university. Oxford,1978
- Rogerson, Barnaby. History of North Africa (Traveller's edition). Interlink Books ed. New York, 2001 ISBN 1-56656-351-8
