= Vescera =

Vescera may refer to:

- Vescera (Ad Piscinam), former name of the Algerian city Biskra
- Michael Vescera (born 1962), American heavy metal singer
