= Kouass =

Archaeological site

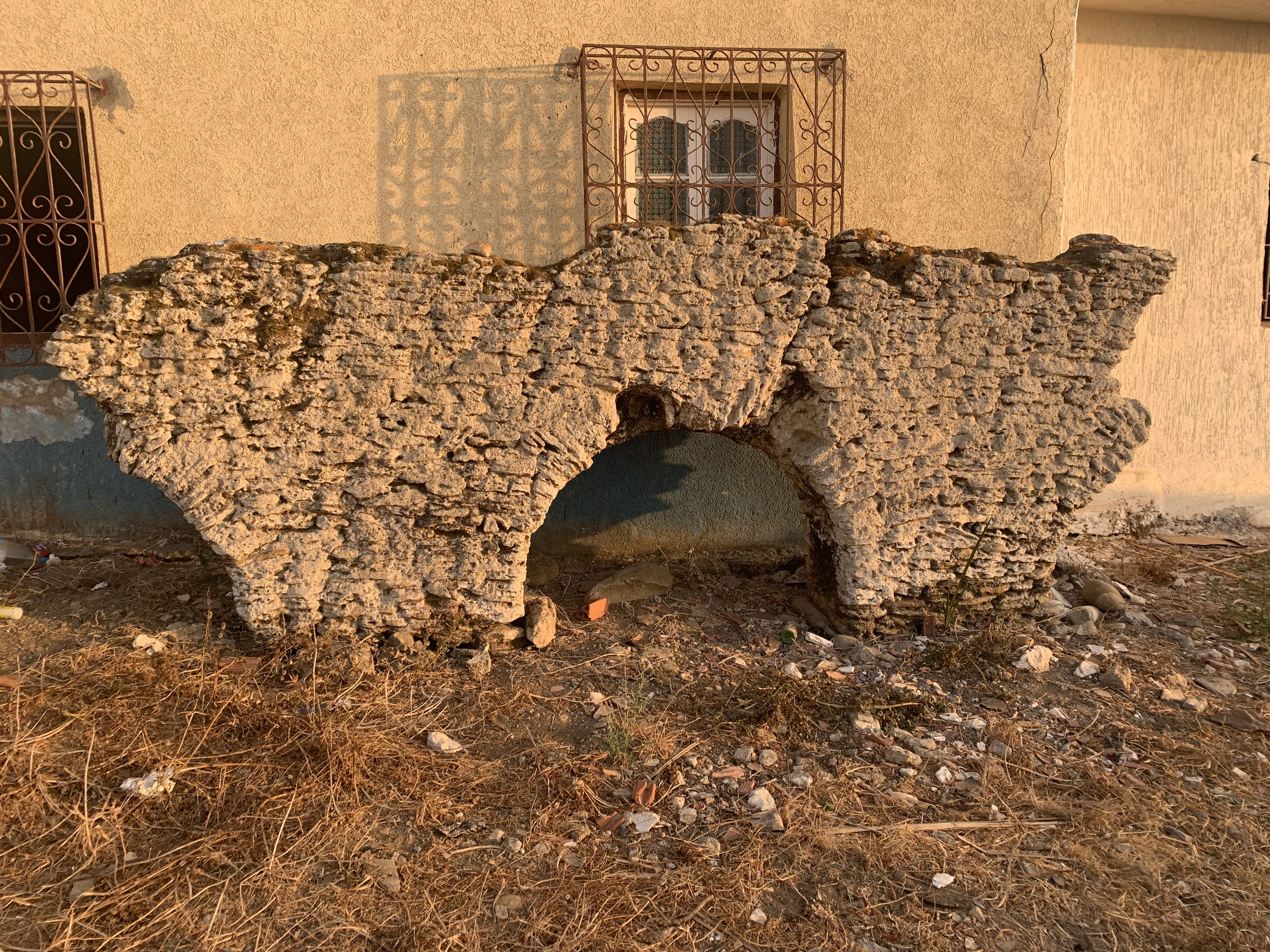
- Monument in Briech
- Interactive map of Kouass
- 35°31′53.4″N 5°59′45.5″W
- Type: Settlement
- Location: Morocco

Kouass (Moroccan Arabic: قواس) is a settlement in northern Morocco near the town of Asilah. It was occupied in both the Punic and Roman periods and later in the Medieval period, and served as an important port and industrial centre.: A number of structures have been identified at the site, including a Roman aqueduct and ovens for the production of pottery.

== Name ==
The original name of the site is unknown from historical and epigraphic sources. The name 'Kouass' is believed to come from the Arabic term for 'arches' or 'arcades' (Arabic: أقواس), which may refer to the remains of the Roman aqueduct at the site.

== Location ==
The site is located 25 km from Tangier, on the north bank of the Oued Garifa, known in ancient times as Anides. The estuary likely would have been deeper in Antiquity, allowing for boats to navigate it safely. Kouass is also located along the probable path of a Roman road between Tangier (then Tingis) and Lixus. This location would have connected the site to land and sea routes, and is situated near a natural harbor. The site is located c. 40 kilometres between Tangier and Lixus, which is the estimated distance that Carthaginian boats could travel in a day, making it an efficient place to stop.

Kouass is also 8 kilometres from the Roman site of Zilil at Dchar Jdid.

== History ==
Some authors have argued that the site can be identified with the gulf of Kotes mentioned in Scylax's peripulus.

Archaeologists have proposed a chronology of five phases of occupation based on excavation evidence

- Islamic reoccupation period: 12th-15th centuries CE
- Recent mauretanian period: 1st century BCE
- Middle mauretanian period: 3rd-2nd centuries BCE
- Ancient mauretanian period: 5th-4th centuries BCE
- Archaic mauretanian period: before the 5th century BCE

== Archaeology ==
Excavations were first carried out at Kouass by Michel Ponsich in the 1960s. Further excavations have been undertaken in the 2010s by a team led by Virginie Bridoux and Mohamed Kbiri Alaoui.

=== Conclusions of archaeological work and structures of note ===
Geophysical mapping has shown the site to be at least 2 hectares in size, with a number of structures and different areas.

Ponsich identified four fish-salting plants in his work that he dated between the 1st-3rd centuries CE. These were no longer visible when work was undertaken in the 2010s although geomagnetic surveys identified a plausible location.

Ponsich also identified a pre-roman 'camp' structure at the site, which he determined had existed at least in the . Geomagnetic survey identified another wall, which if part of the same structure originally noted by Ponsich would make it a rectangular structure measuring nearly 60 metres East-West.

Ruins of an aqueduct with at least 81 arches were visible in the 1960s, connecting a water source near the 'camp' to the coast. The aqueduct has largely been covered by modern buildings in the decades following.

Geophysical survey and excavation carried out in the 2010s revealed a paved courtyard (with sides of approximately 6 meters) at the site that surrounds a square structure. This has been interpreted as possible evidence that there was a monumental religious site at Kouass as early as the 4th century BCE.

=== Ceramics ===
The site lends its name to a ceramic type known as 'Kouass-ware'.
