= Curubis tetrica =

Scientific classification
- Kingdom: Animalia
- Phylum: Arthropoda
- Subphylum: Chelicerata
- Class: Arachnida
- Order: Araneae
- Infraorder: Araneomorphae
- Family: Salticidae
- Genus: Curubis
- Species: C. tetrica

Binomial name
- Curubis tetrica Simon, 1902

Species of spider

Curubis tetrica, is a species of spider of the genus Curubis. It is found in Sri Lanka and India.
