= Tocolsida =

Archaeological site and former Roman fort in Morocco

Coordinates: 34°02′17″N 5°34′52″W

Main Roman roads in western north Africa

Tocolsida is a site in modern Morocco, with the remains of an ancient castra from the Roman Province of Mauretania Tingitana, Roman Empire.

The site is on the Wadi Rdem in the foot hills of the Atlas Mountains, south of Roman Volubilis. In antiquity it was on the Limes Africanus at the end of the Roman Road. near the modern village of Tagourart Ain Karma just north of Meknes, and west of Fez.

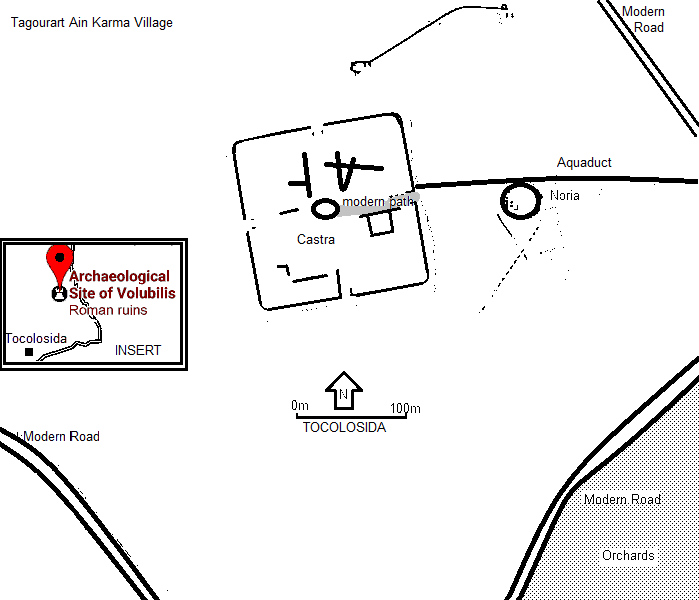
Diagram of the location and layout of the Archaeological ruins of the Roman Castra of Tocolsida, southern Morocco. Reconstruction from original sources

Tocolsida was one of the five fortresses built to defend the city of Volubilis and was active from 30BC – AD300. Though some archaeology suggest occupation till the Muslim conquest of the Maghreb.

The fort was mentioned on the Antonine Itinerary. and Ptolemy's Geography.

The castra was founded under the emperor Antoninus Pius and housed squadrons of Gallic and Syrian cavalry. There was an aqueduct, at Tocolosida.

Tocolosida was excavated by the French in the early 20th century.

Tocolosida is also known as El-Jezira, Bled Takourart and Aïn Takourart.
