= Rusadir =

Ancient Punic and Roman town

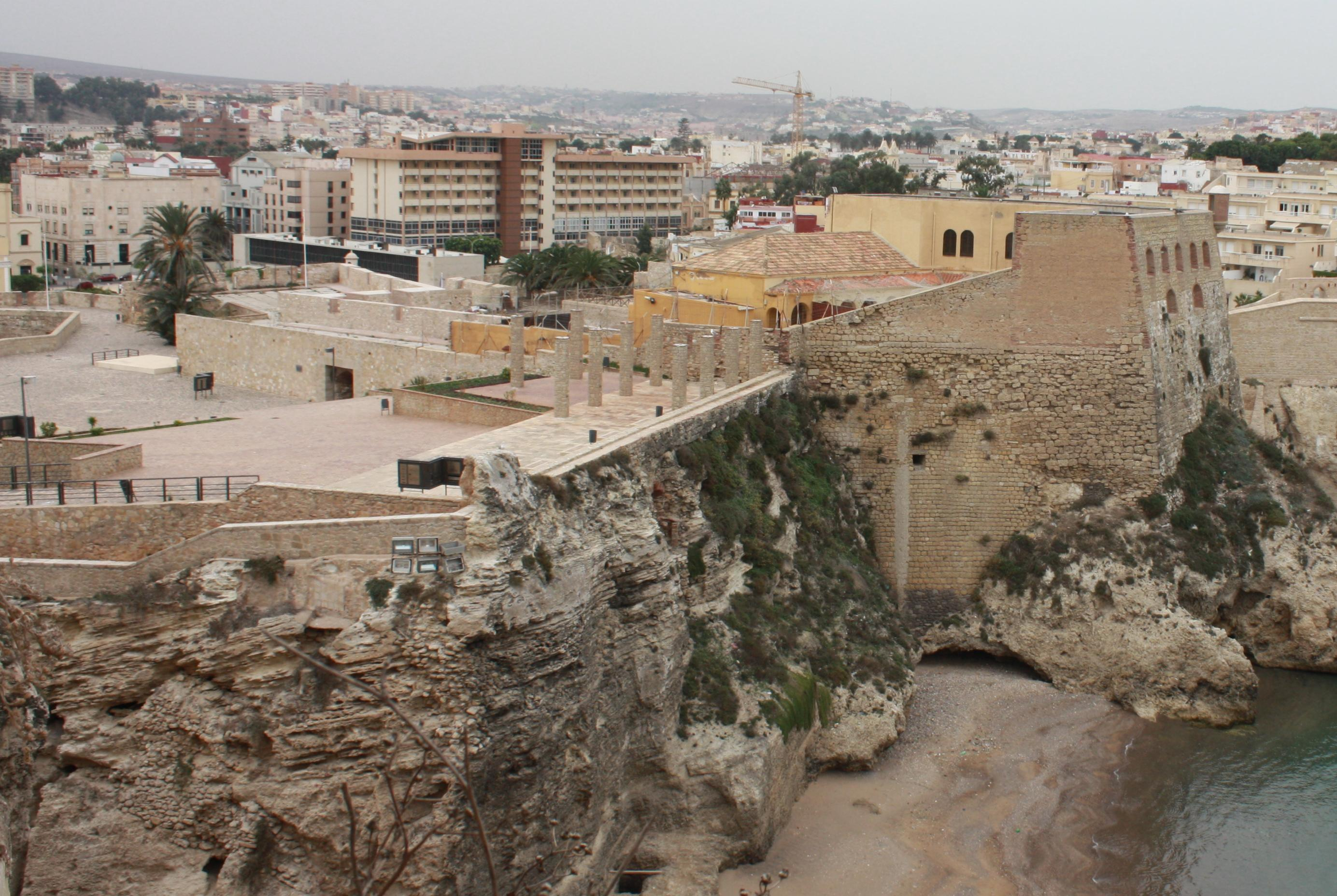
- Melilla la Vieja is built over Roman Rusadir

- Location within Spain
- 35°17′38″N 2°55′59″W
- Location: Spain
- Region: Melilla

Rusadir was an ancient Punic and Roman town at what is now Melilla, Spain, in the Maghreb. Under the Roman Empire, it was a colony in the province of Mauretania Tingitana.

== Name ==
ršʾdr (Punic: 𐤓𐤔𐤀𐤃𐤓) was a Punic name meaning "Powerful" or "High Cape", after its nearby headland. It can also be understood as "Cape of the Powerful One", in reference to Baal, Tanit, or some other important Punic god. The format is similar to other Punic names along the North African coast, including Rusguniae, Rusubbicari, Rusuccuru, Rusippisir, Rusigan (Rachgoun), Rusicade, Ruspina, Ruspe, and Rsmlqr. The settlement's name was hellenized as Rhyssádeiron (Ancient Greek: Ῥυσσάδειρον). It appears in Latin as Rusadir, Rusicada, and Rusadder. As a Roman colony, it was also known as Flavia.

== Geography ==
Like Abyla (present-day Ceuta), Rusadir was located on a small, easily defended peninsula connected to mainland Africa by a narrow isthmus. Its namesake cape is small but includes a large rocky hill, which was fortified. It lies at the northern end of a small bight which formed its harbor, itself part of the eastern shore of a much larger bight that stretches across the southern Mediterranean coast from Cape Three Forks (the classical Metagonites Promontorium) to Cape Figalo west of Oran. Rusadir's own small bight lies beside a kind of natural amphitheater on the eastern slope of a steep rock 500 meters (1,640 ft) high, where modern Melilla has grown up.

== History ==
=== Punic town ===
Rusadir was established as a Phoenician colony along the trading route between Phoenicia and the Strait of Gibraltar, itself guarded by the colonies of Tinga (Tangier), Abyla (Ceuta), Kart (San Roque), and Gadir (Cádiz). Like other outposts in the West, Rusadir eventually fell under Carthaginian dominion.

=== Mauretanian town ===
After Carthage's defeat in the Punic Wars, Rusadir passed into the control of the Roman client state Mauretania. It minted its own bronze coins, with Punic text and a bearded head (possibly Baal Hammon) obverse and a bee between ears of wheat reverse.

=== Roman town ===
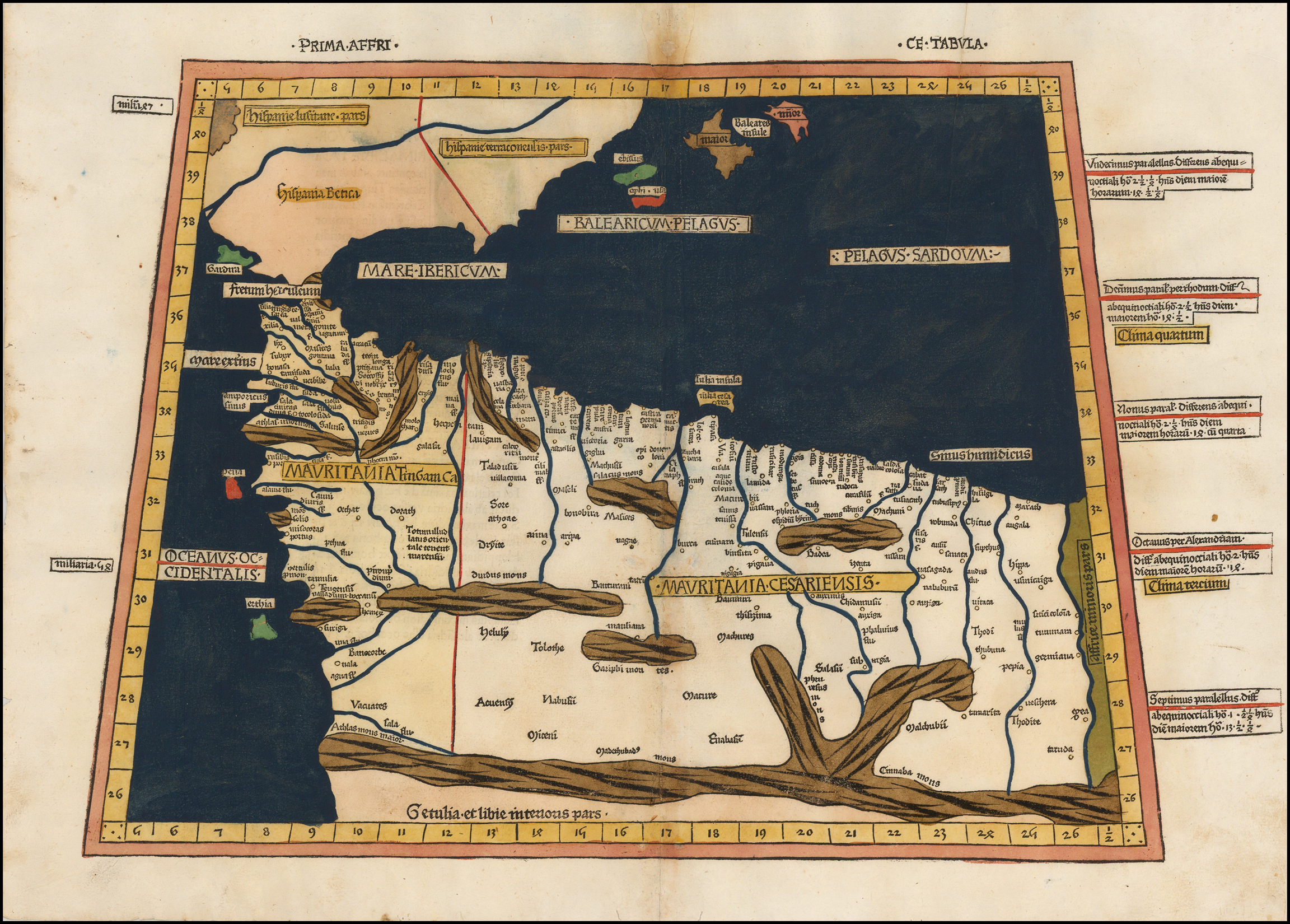
Ptolemy's 1st African map, showing Roman Mauretania Tingitana

Caligula assassinated the Mauretanian king in AD 40 and proclaimed the annexation of his kingdom. His successor Claudius organized the new territories, placing Rusadir within the province of Mauretania Tingitana. Pliny describes 1st-century Rusadir as a native hillfort (oppidum) and port (portus). It was made a colony in AD 46.

By the 3rd century, Rusadir was fully Christianized and quite prosperous. In the 4th century, Rusadir was the principal port for the Mauro-Roman kingdom.

=== Later history ===
The Vandal king Gaiseric, probably invited by Count Boniface, crossed from Spain to Tingis (Tangier) in 429. Some of his tens of thousands of followers besieged and conquered Rusadir around 430, while others overran the rest of northwest Africa. Focusing his attention on the Roman province of Africa, Gaiseric allowed Berber rebellions to remove most of his western territories from his control. Rusadir became part of the Berber kingdom of Altava.

The Byzantine general Belisarius restored Roman control over Northern Africa (including Rusadir) around the year 533, as part of Justinian's Vandalic War. The Exarchate of Africa established by the Byzantines also focused most of its attention on the area of present-day Tunisia and did not expand into the Mauretanian hinterland. Instead, it oversaw its fortified ports from the easily protected stronghold of Septem (Ceuta). Rusadir was conquered by the Visigoth general Suintila (probably on behalf of king Sisebuto) in 614. By the early 7th century a Christian bishop with seat in the city was mentioned in the Thronus Alexandrinus. By 700, Rusadir was conquered by Musa ibn Nusayr on behalf of the Umayyad Caliphate. With an uncertain existence as populated settlement by the mid 9th century, the city was repopulated by Berbers by the late 9th century (c. 890), when it was already known by its new name, Malila/Melilla/Amlil. It was seized by an Andalusian army on behalf of Abd al-Rahman III, emir (soon-to-be Caliph) of Córdoba in 926–927.

It was conquered by the Castilian nobleman Juan Alfonso Pérez de Guzmán in 1497 and—under the name Melilla (q.v.)—was formally annexed by Castile in 1506.

== Religion ==
Rusadir remains a titular see of the Roman Catholic Church.

== See also ==
- Melilla, for the town's subsequent history
- Tingis, Abyla, Lixus, & Tamuda
- Roman 'Coloniae' in Berber Africa
