= Church of Iulia Constantia Zilil =

Early Christian church in Morocco

The Church of Iulia Constantia was an Early Christian church in Morocco, located in the Roman colony of Iulia Constantia Zilil.

== Characteristics ==
It had three naves, was equipped with a baptistery and had various appendices, close to the western door.

This paleochristian church was the only one found in Atlantic Morocco, and harkens to the adoption of Christianity by romanised Berbers.

== See also ==
- Iulia Constantia Zilil
- Christian Berbers
