= Oulad Slama =

Oulad Slama أولاد سلامة
- Rural commune and town
- Location within Morocco
- Coordinates: 34.3356°N 6.4604°W
- Country: Morocco
- Region: Rabat-Salé-Kénitra
- Province: Kénitra

Population (2004)
  - Total: 15,936
- Time zone: UTC+0 (GMT)

Oulad Slama (Arabic: أولاد سلامة) is a small town and rural commune in Kénitra Province, Rabat-Salé-Kénitra, Morocco. At the time of the 2004 census, the commune had a total population of 15,936 people living in 2278 households.
