= Vescera (Ad Piscinam) =

- Ad Piscinam
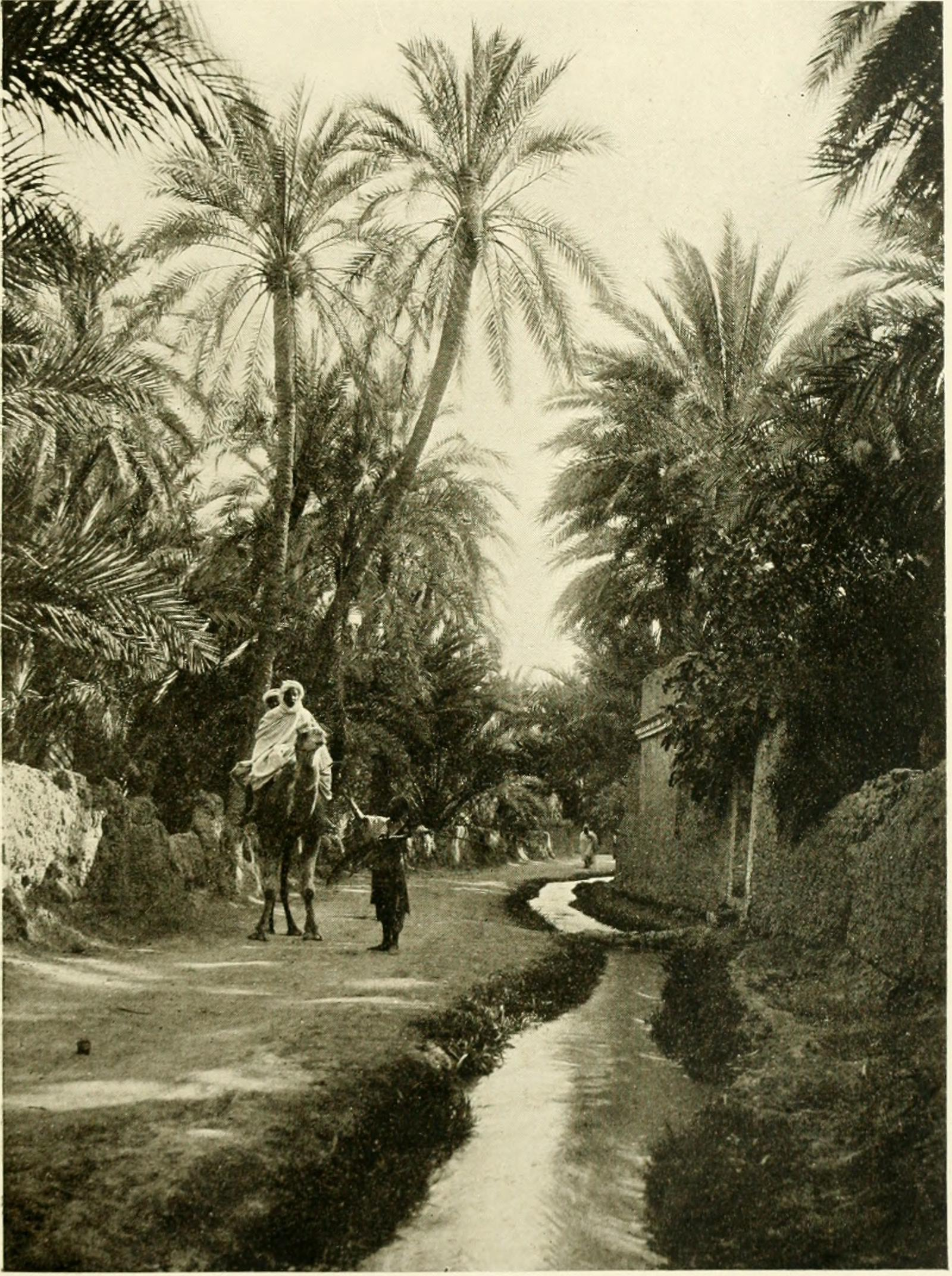
- Oasis at Vescera in 1910

- Location within Algeria
- 34.85°N 5.733333°E
- Location: Algeria
- Region: Biskra Province

Vescera, also known as Ad Piscinam, was an ancient titular see and Roman colony in Roman North Africa. It has been identified as a site near Biskra in Algeria. It remains as a titular see of the Roman Catholic Church in the Province of Numidia.

== History ==
The city was founded soon after the arrival of the Romans around 200 AD under Septimius Severus, and became part of the province of Numidia. As a major settlement in the border region, it was significant even then. Its name was apparently bowdlerized by the Romans to Ad Piscīnam ("at the piscīna"), implying the presence of important waterworks.

The city fell to the Arab armies during the end of the 7th century. A significant portion of the inhabitants of the area still descend from the Arab bedouin tribe of Banu Hilal, others are mainly Chaoui Berbers.

== Bishopric ==
The city was the seat of a bishopric in Roman times and was one of the main centers in the Donatist schism of the 4th century. Three historic bishops are known:

- Optatus (Catholic) fl.411 and friend of Augustine of Hippo
- Fortunatus (Donatist) fl.411
- Felix (Catholic) fl.484

In the 20th century the bishopric was nominally re-established as a titular see. Modern bishops include:

- Louis-Georges-Firmin Demol, (Jan 27 1936 Appointed – Jul 2 1969)
- José Gustavo Angel Ramirez, (Jun 19 1989 Appointed – Feb 23 2013)
- John Bosco Chang Shin-Ho (31 May 2016 Appointed – present)

== See also ==
- Roman colonies in North Africa
