= Iulia Campestris Babba =

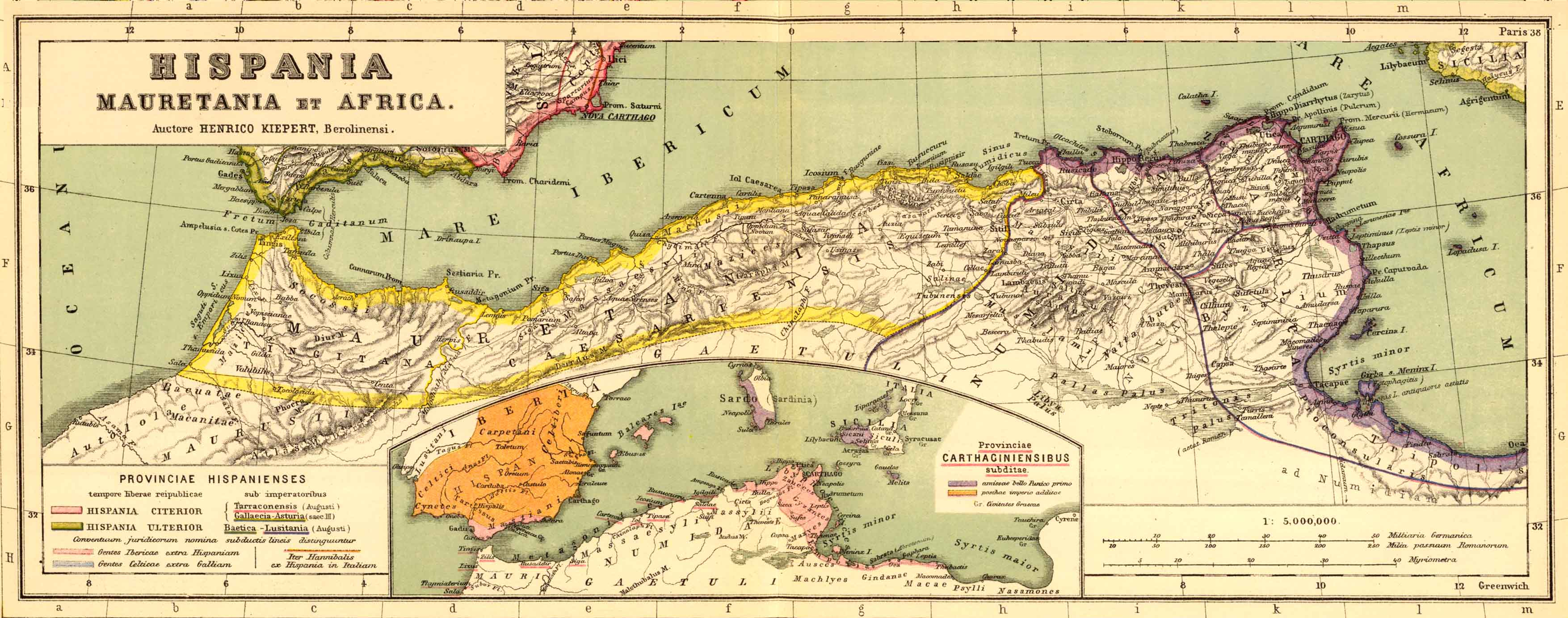
Map showing the Roman city of "Babba" (enlarge Morocco section)

Iulia Campestris Babba is a Mauretanian city created as Roman colony around 30 BC by emperor Augustus. Its actual location is currently unknown, though its existence is confirmed by the literature.

== Characteristics ==
Colonia Iulia Campestris Babba was one of the three colonias in Mauretania Tingitana (in northern Morocco) founded by emperor Augustus between 30 and 25 BC for veterans of the battle of Actium. Nearly 10,000 legionaries settled in Iulia Valentia Banasa, Iulia Constantia Zilil and Babba, according to historian Theodore Mommsen.

The city of Babba in Mauritania Tingitana was probably situated on or near the river Lixus (El Haratel); and was made a colony in honor of Julius Caesar, as its name Iulia indicated. It was also called Campestris because away from the sea The city was populated by Roman colonists and their descendants and by romanised berbers.

The exact location of Babba has been debated by many scholars, but one of the most probable possibilities is that Babba was the "Oppidum Novum" (actual Ksar el-Kebir) of the "Itineraries of Antonius Augustus". Indeed, historian Euzennat believe that "can not be excluded in these circumstances that it was the colonia Iulia, which might have disappeared in the troubles of the second century AD before being reborn as Oppidum novum". But some researchers argue that Babba can be the old Roman city of "Tremulae" (actual Basra) and even the city of Thamusida.

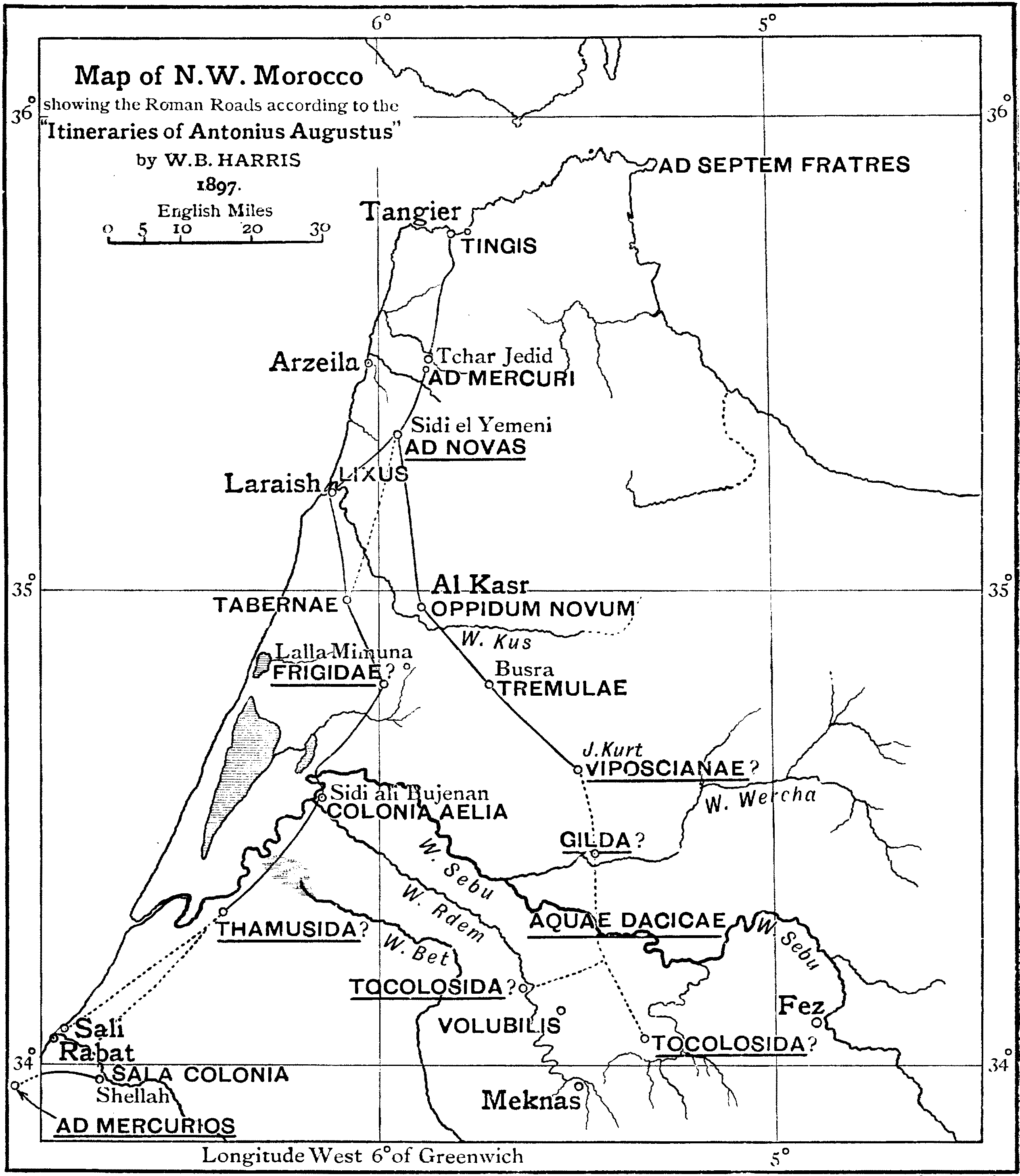
Iulia Campestris Babba was probably "Oppidum Novum" on this map of the Roman roads in Morocco

The city was probably abandoned at the end of the third century, by orders of emperor Diocletian. Indeed, Rome's control over the city probably ended following the chaos of the Crisis of the Third Century, when the Roman Empire nearly disintegrated as a series of generals seized and lost power through civil wars, palace coups and assassinations. Roman rule collapsed in much of Mauretania and was never re-established. Only a northern section of Mauretania Tingitana remained under Roman control. In 285 AD, Diocletian reorganised what was left of the province to retain only the coastal strip between Lixus, Tingis and Septem (modern Ceuta).

== Bibliography ==
- Boube J. A propos de Babba Iulia Campestris Bull. Archéo. Maroc, t. 15, 1983-1984 (1986), p. 131-137.
- Euzennat M. Babba Iulia Campestris, in The Princeton Encyclopedia of Classical Sites, R. Stillwell éd., Princeton, 1976

== See also ==
- Roman 'Coloniae' in Berber Africa
- Iulia Valentia Banasa
- Iulia Constantia Zilil
- Lixus
- Tingis
- Septem
- Sala (Roman colonia)
