= Iulia Valentia Banasa =

Ancient Berber-Roman city in Morocco

Colonia Iulia Valentia Banasa
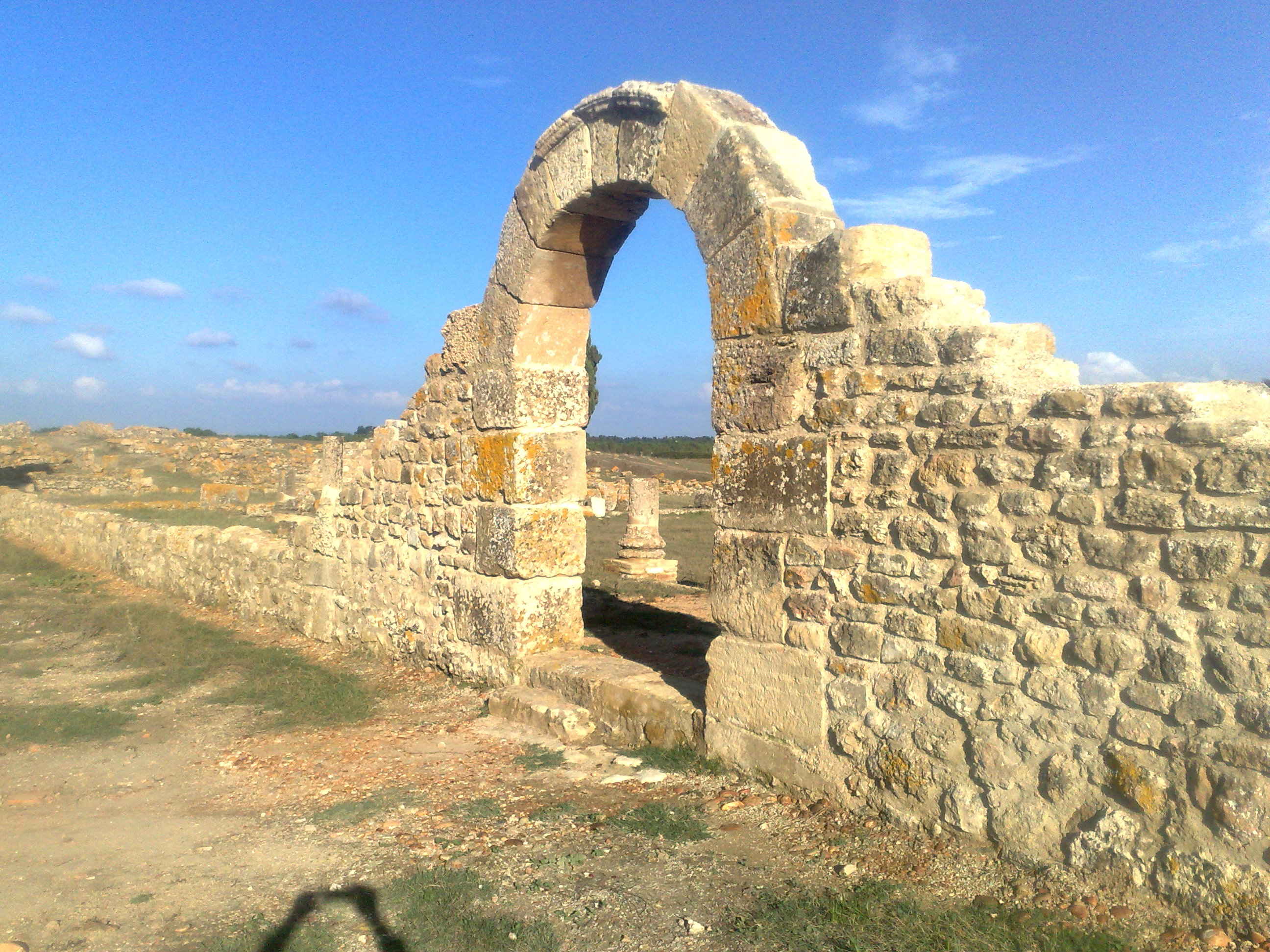
- Interactive map of Colonia Iulia Valentia Banasa
- 34°36′06″N 06°06′56″W
- Type: Settlement
- Location: Sidi Ali Boujenoun, Kénitra Province, Rabat-Salé-Kénitra, Morocco

History
- Built: Between 33 and 25 BC
- Built by: Augustus
- Abandoned: Approximately 285 AD

Iulia Valentia Banasa, corresponding to modern day Sidi Ali Boujnoun (Arabic: سيدي علي بوجنون), was a Roman-Berber city in northern Morocco. It was one of the three colonias in Mauretania Tingitana founded by emperor Augustus between 33 and 25 BC for veterans of the battle of Actium, on top of a Mauretanian village. The site was in fact already occupied by the local Amazigh people from the 4th century BC, or perhaps earlier.

== Characteristics ==
Beautiful mosaics decorated the buildings and now most are shown at the Rabat Archaeological Museum. Four bathhouses were discovered in Banasa.

Some of the other major Roman companion cities to Iulia Valentia Banasa of this early era are Chellah and Volubilis, the latter of which shares the features of basilica and regular street pattern.

Objects recovered at Banasa may be seen at the Rabat Archaeological Museum.

== Zawiya of Sidi Ali Boujnoun ==
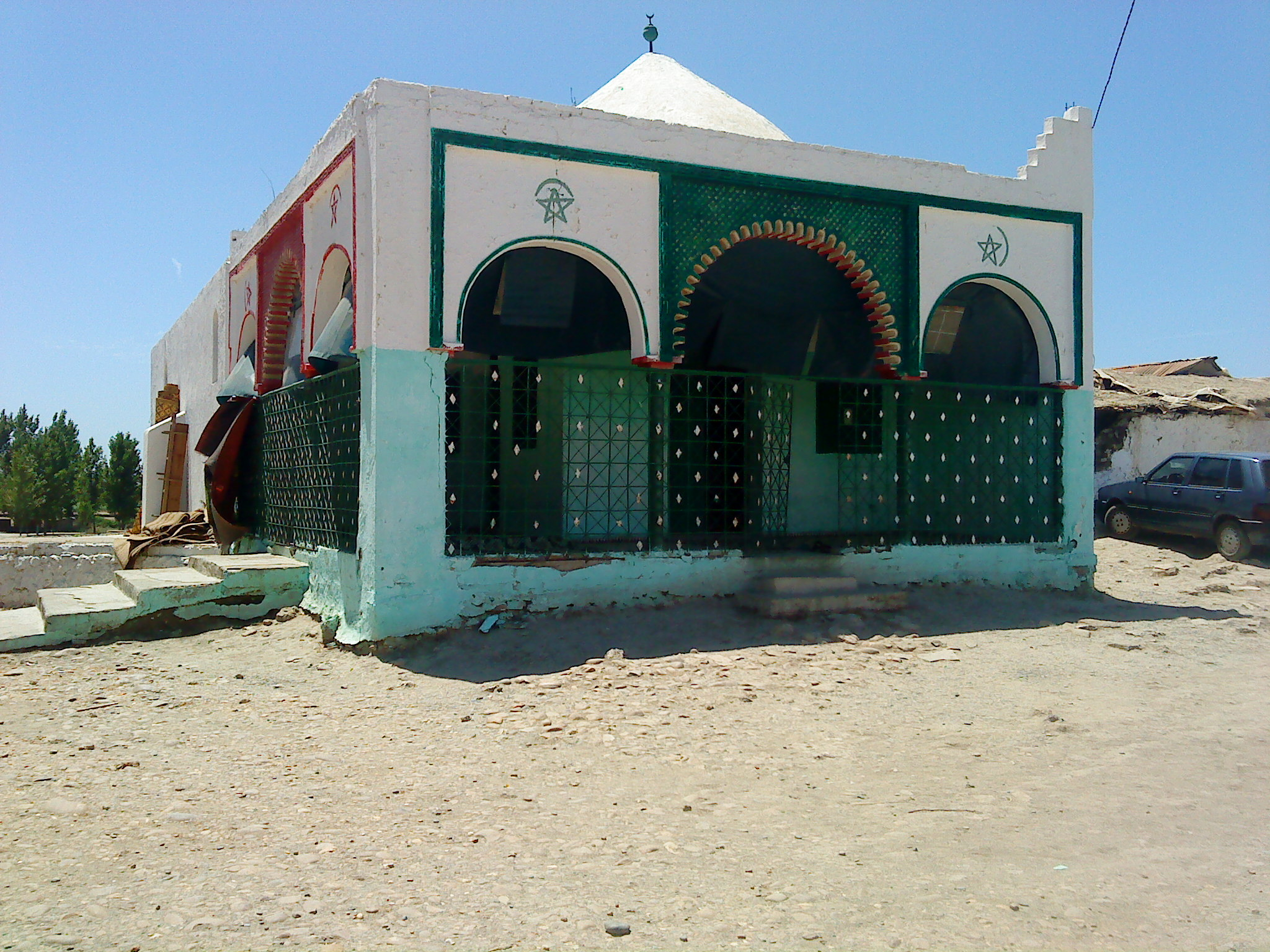
Shrine of Sidi Ali Boujnoun

Today, Banasa is known for the zawiya of Sidi Ali Boujnoun. According to a local tradition, Sidi Ali Boujnoun (or Abu Jnun) belonged to the Khlut tribe and came from the nearby city of Ksar el-Kebir "300 years ago" to teach the people of the area Quran. He was attributed several miracles, most notably the ability to control non-Muslim jinn. The name "Boujnoun" (lit. 'Possessor/Controller of Jinn-induced Insanity') derives from this. He possibly inhabited the ruins of Banasa either because it made controlling jinn easier or so he could isolate himself for spiritual retreats. Today, many visitors from the Gharb region come to the zawiya mostly for mental health-related issues.

== Gallery ==
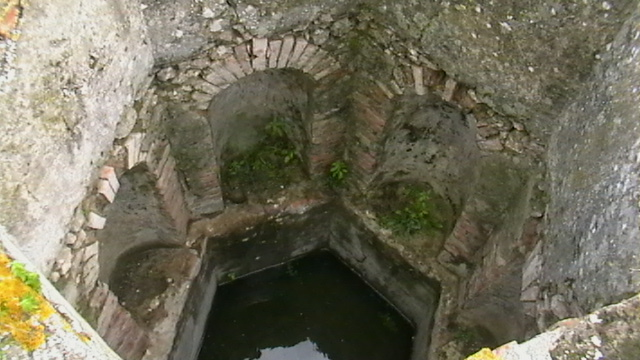
Roman ruins of Banasa: thermae with fresco

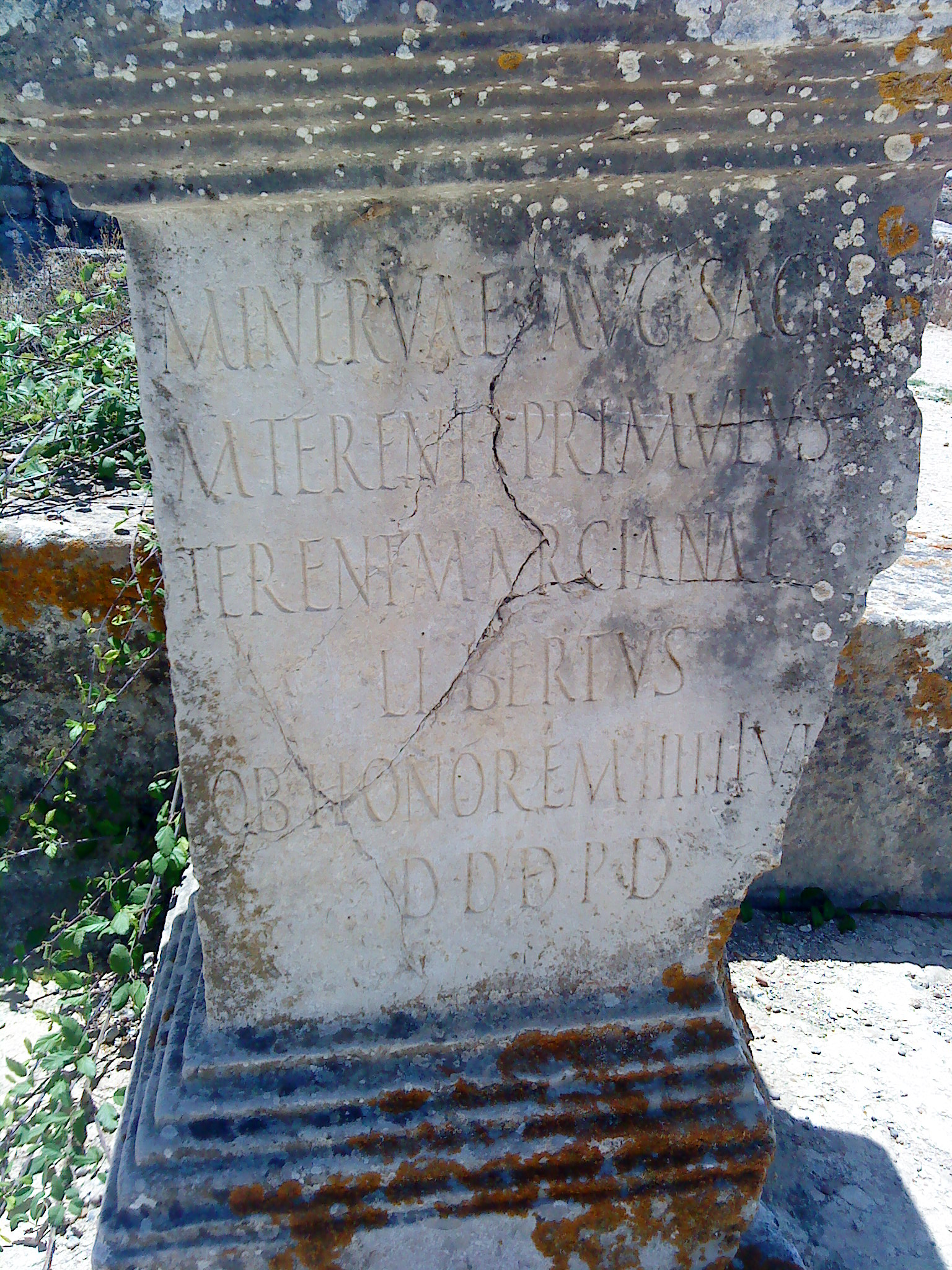
Stone written in Latin

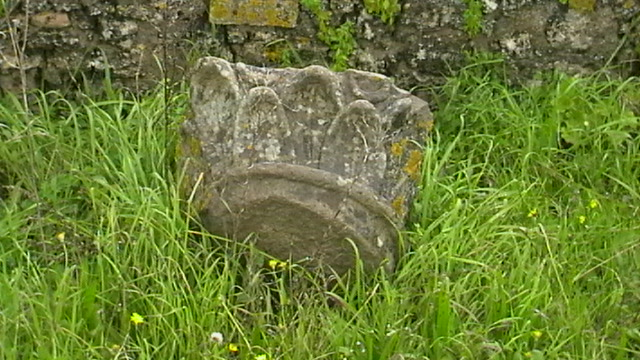
Section of Roman column

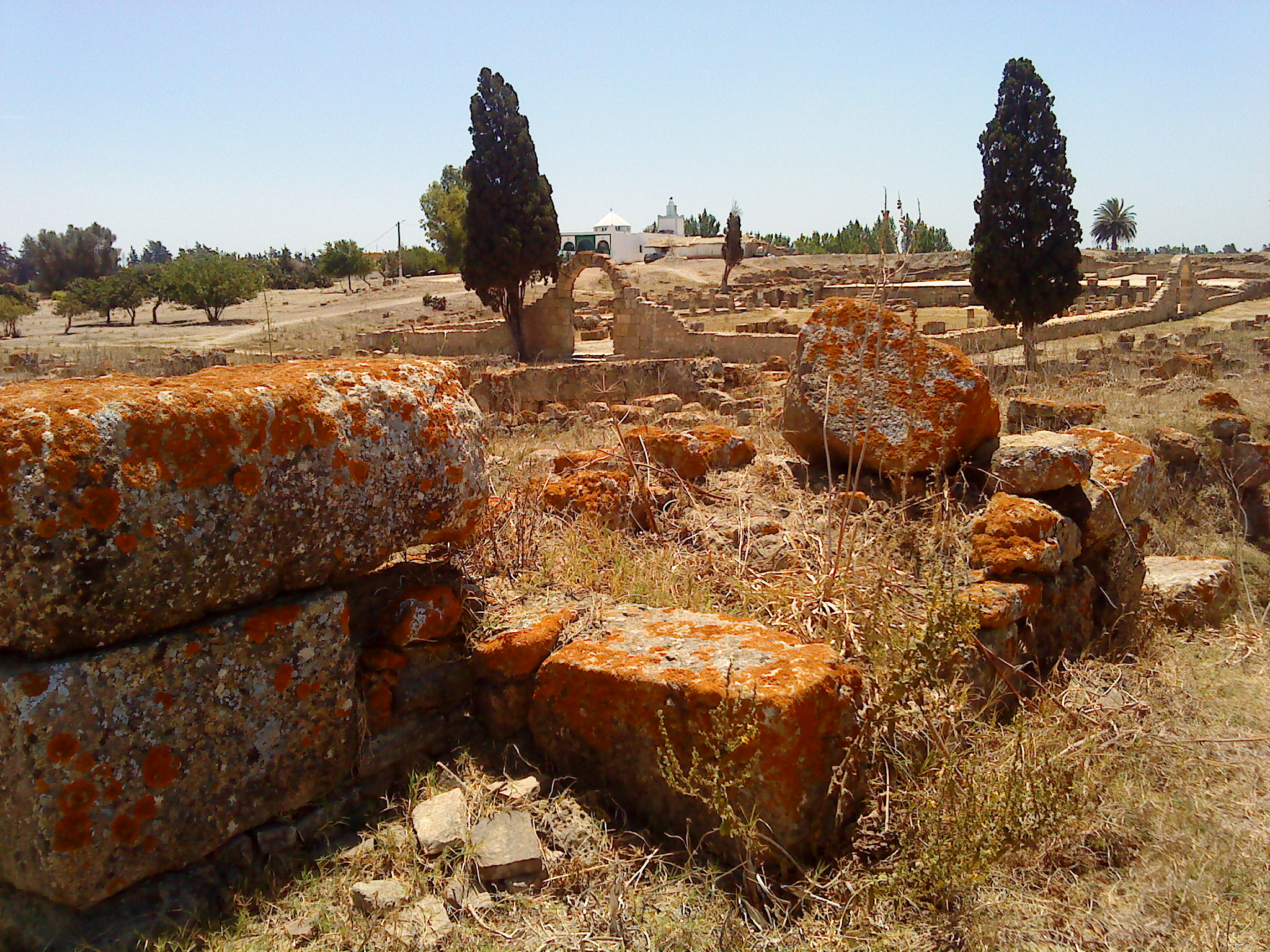
View of Banasa ruins

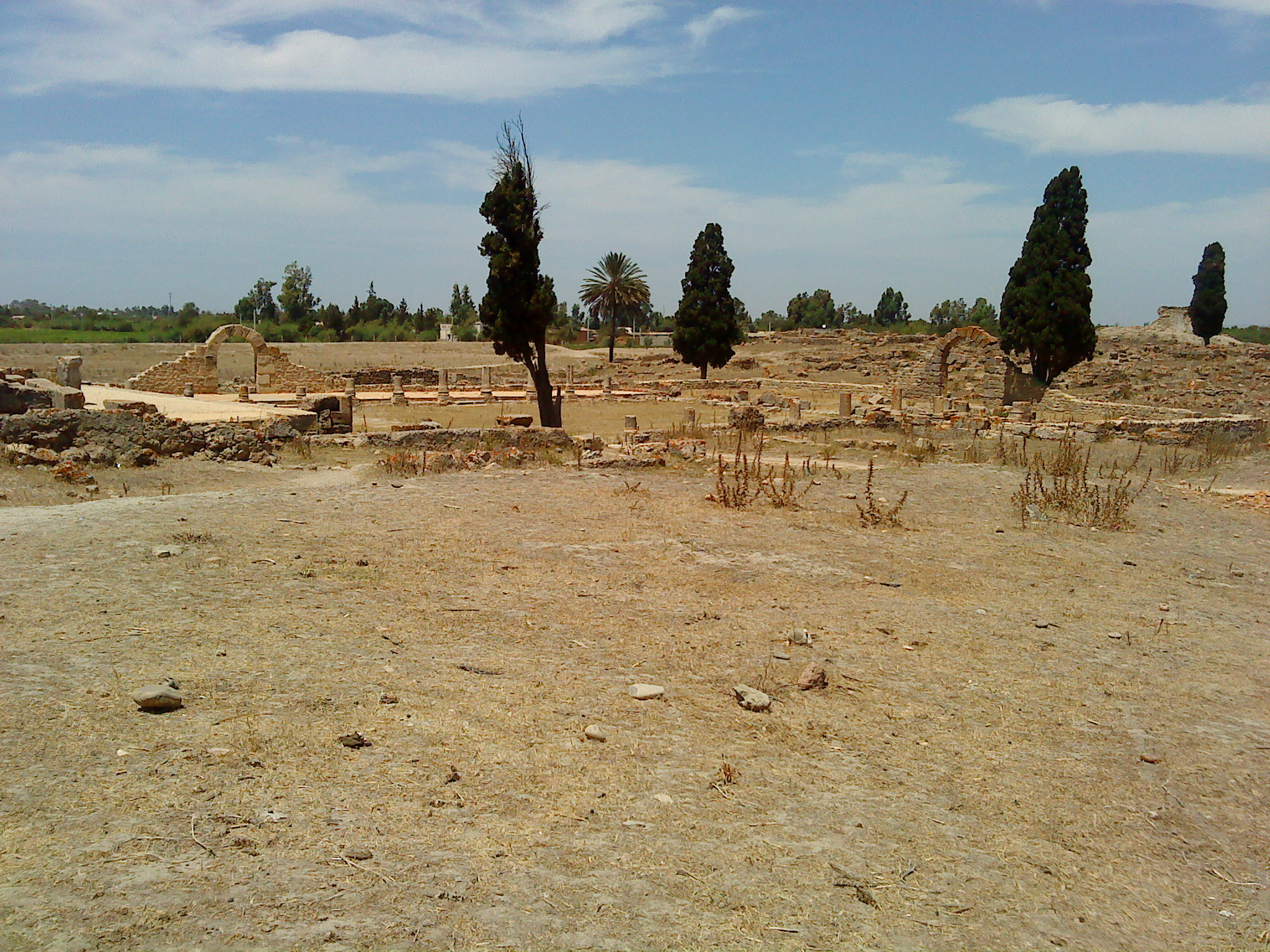
View of the Roman Forum and Basilica

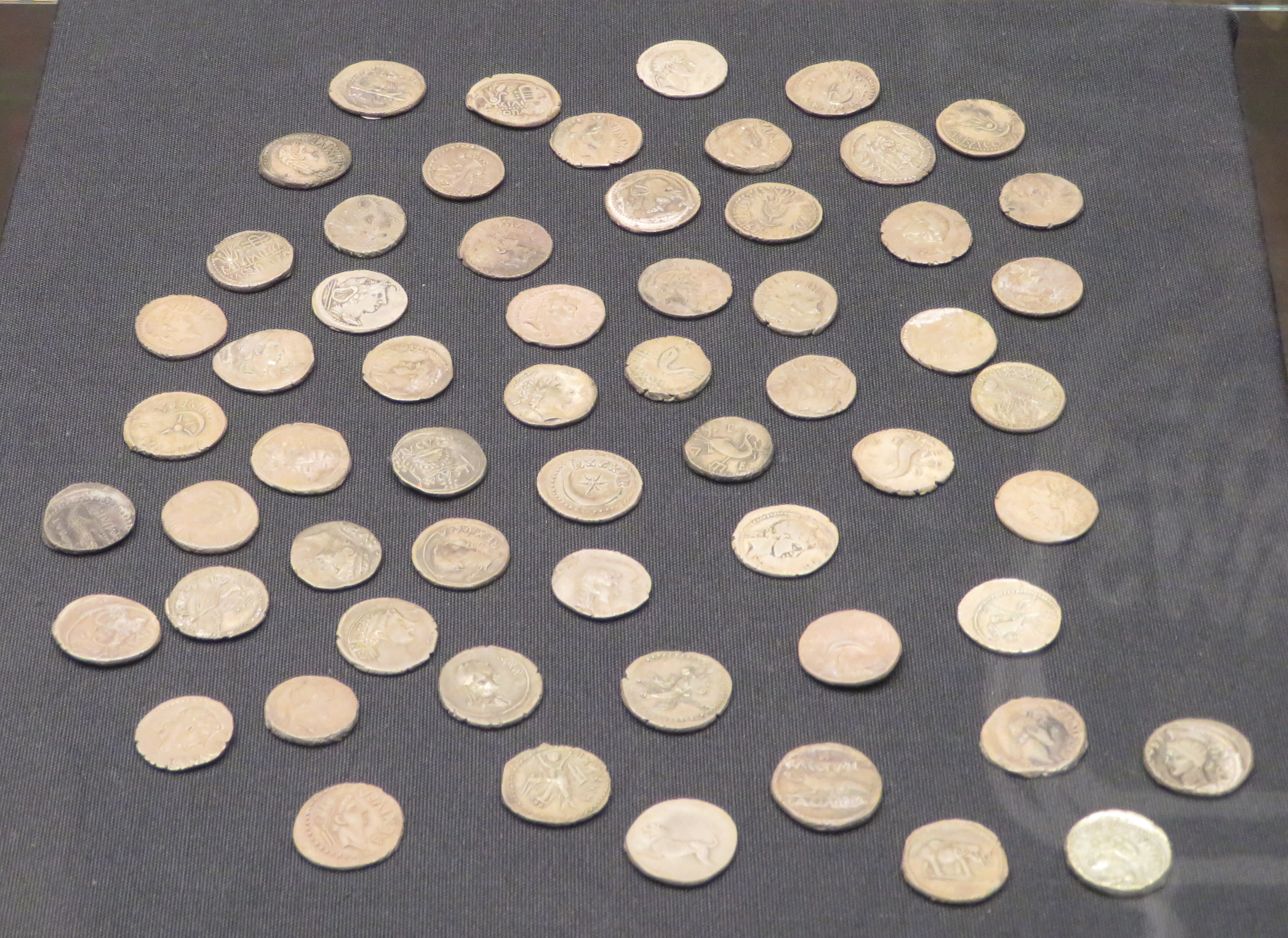
Hoard of 60 denarius silver coins found in Banasa

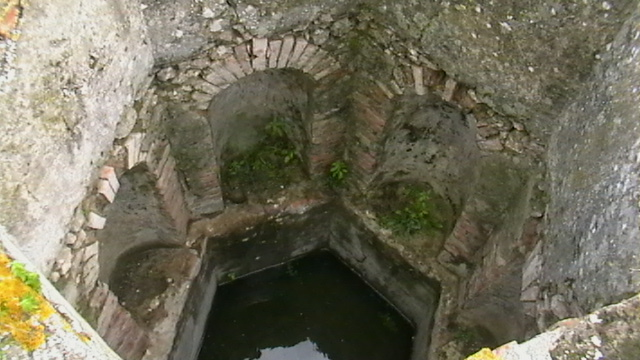

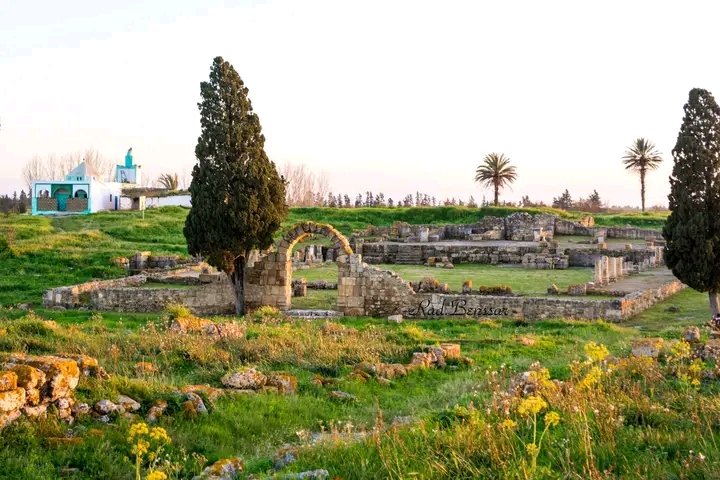

== See also ==
- Iulia Campestris Babba
- Iulia Constantia Zilil
- Lixus
- Mauretania Tingitana
- Rusadir
- Sala Colonia
- Tamuda
- Thamusida
- Tingis
- Volubilis

== Bibliography ==
- William Seston & Maurice Euzennat, « La citoyenneté romaine au temps de Marc Aurèle et de Commode, d'après la Tabula Banasitana », CRAI, 105-2, 1961, p. 317-324
