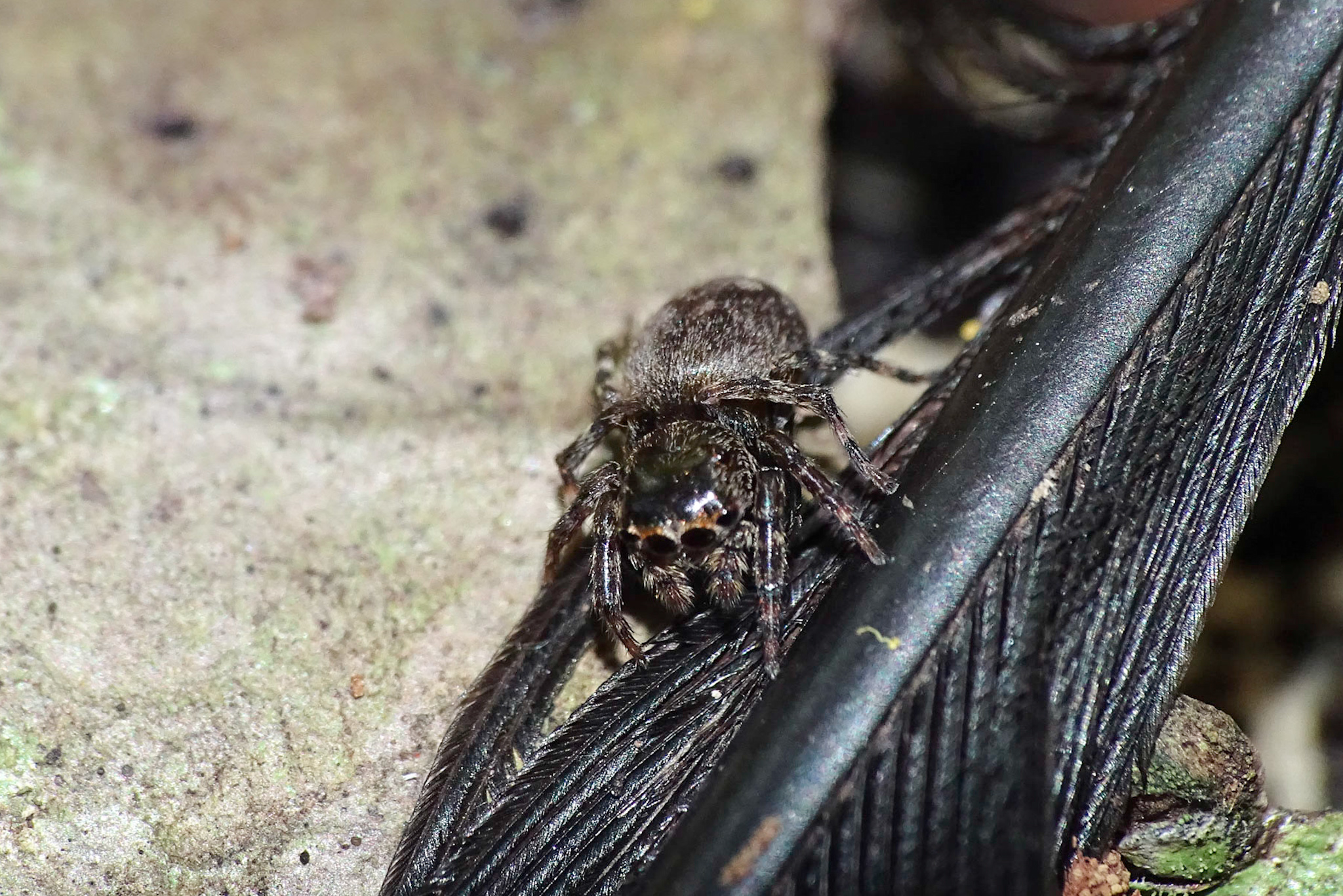

Scientific classification
- Kingdom: Animalia
- Phylum: Arthropoda
- Subphylum: Chelicerata
- Class: Arachnida
- Order: Araneae
- Infraorder: Araneomorphae
- Family: Salticidae
- Subfamily: Salticinae
- Genus: Curubis; Simon, 1902

Type species
- C. erratica Simon, 1902

Species
- 4, see text

= Curubis =

Genus of spiders

Curubis is a genus of Asian jumping spiders native to India and Sri Lanka which was first described by Eugène Louis Simon in 1902. As of 2019 it contains four species.

== Species ==
As of June 2019 it contains four species, found only in India and Sri Lanka:

- Curubis annulata Simon, 1902 – Sri Lanka
- Curubis erratica Simon, 1902 (type) – India, Sri Lanka
- Curubis sipeki Dobroruka, 2004 – India
- Curubis tetrica Simon, 1902 – India, Sri Lanka
