= Olbasa (Lycaonia) =

Olbasa (Ancient Greek: Ὄλβασα) was a town in the Antiochiana district of ancient Lycaonia southwest of Cybistra.

Its site is unlocated.
