= Olbasa (Pisidia) =

Town in the western part of ancient Pisidia

Coordinates: 37°18′16″N 29°59′45″E

Olbasa (Ancient Greek: Ὄλβασα) was a town in the western part of ancient Pisidia between Adada and Zorzela. It later received a Roman colony under the name of Colonia Iulia Augusta.

Its site is located near Belenli, in Burdur Province.
