= Tamuda =

Ancient Berber city and Roman military camp in Morocco

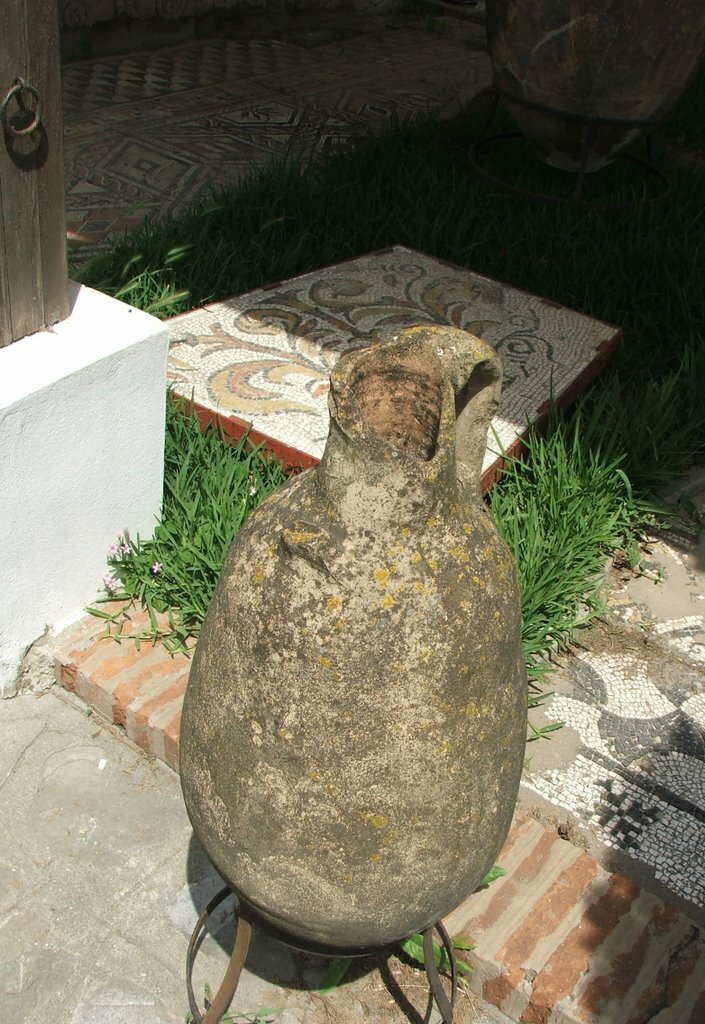
- Roman amphora and mosaic of Tamuda, in the "Archaeological Museum of Tetouan"

- Location within Morocco
- 35°33′30″N 5°24′35″W
- Location: Morocco
- Region: Tanger-Tetouan-Al Hoceima

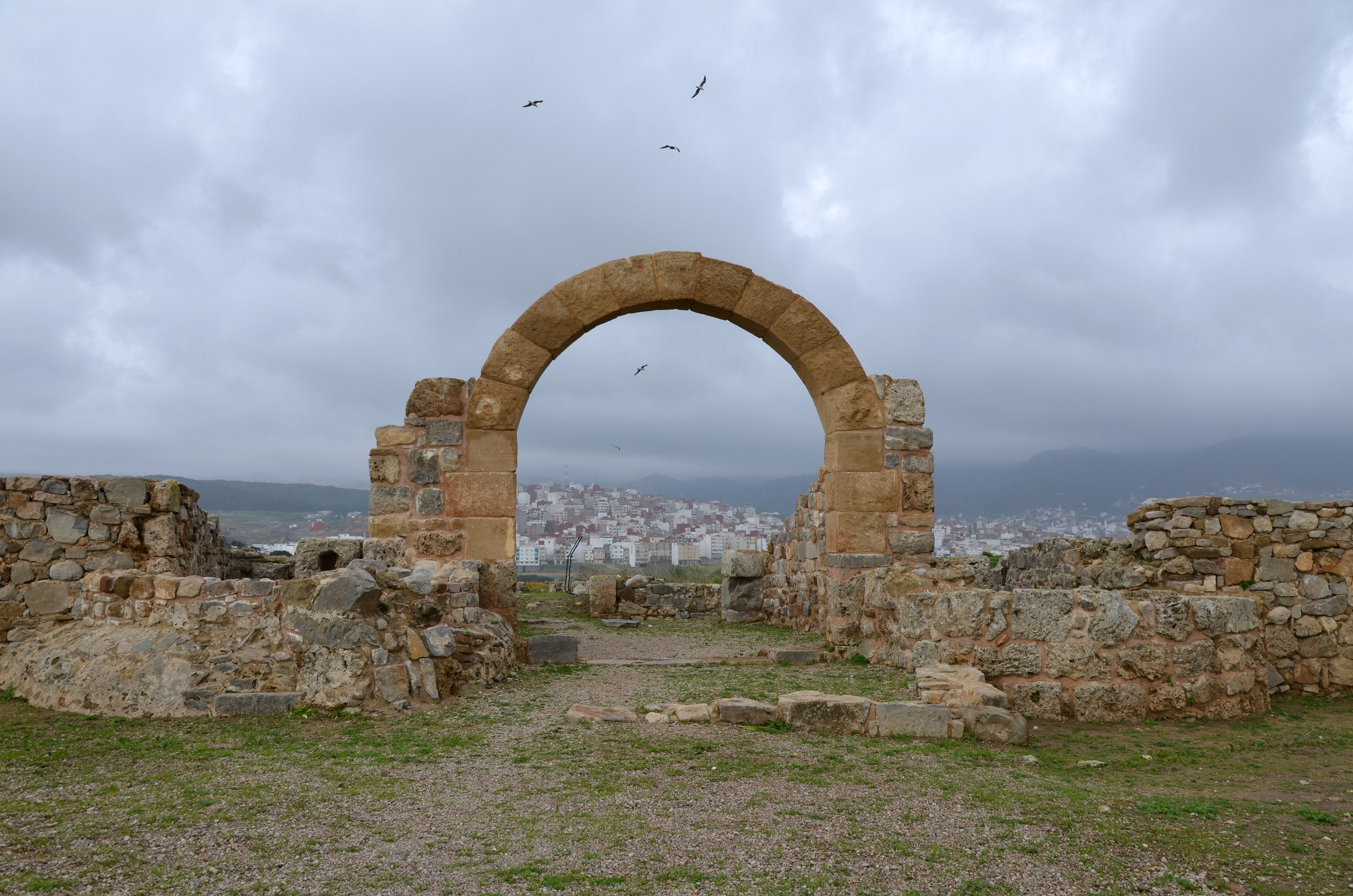
Roman military camp of Tamuda.

Tamuda was an ancient Berber city and military camp in Mauretania Tingitana. It is located 6 km (4 miles) west of the present-day Tetouan in northern Morocco. Stone ruins from the site are found by the south bank of the Martil Valley. It was considered a city in accordance with the rules of urbanization of the time.

== History ==
The ancient city was founded in the 3rd century BC by the Mauretanian Berbers of northern Morocco. Probably there was a Phoenician presence during the next century, mainly for commerce. A type of a seahorse, representing Phoenician iconography, with rider encountered on a clay jar was found at Tamuda.

Under the Emperor Augustus Romans occupied the city. Around 42 AD, Roman garrisons leveled Tamuda during an insurrection and in its stead erected a fortified settlement. The Emperor Augustus' successors later rebuilt the city as a Roman castrum.

Tamuda became later one of the major cities of the Roman province Mauretania Tingitana and enjoyed a development during Trajan and Septimius Severus rule. It was used for fish salting and purple production, according to researcher from the University of Cadiz. On the Notitia Dignitatum, written in the fifth century, it is stated that at the end of the fourth century Tamuda's castrum was the headquarters of an "Ala Herculea" (cavalry unit) of local limitanei and that was related to a cohortes of Lixus.

The region around Tamuda was fully Romanized, Christianized and "pacified" during the fifth century and the fort probably was dismantled. By the time the Vandals arrived in the fifth century the city had been possibly abandoned as no contemporary chronicle mentions it anymore.

In the late 13th century small fortifications existed near the Roman ruins with the name "Tittawin", that later were renamed "Tetouan".

== Excavations ==
Artifacts from both the Roman and the Phoenician era have been found in the site of Tamuda.

In 1933, a third century (circa 253-257 A.D.) stone recording a Roman victory over some unnamed barbarians was discovered at the site of Tamuda. It is believed that the inscription refers to the Franks.

In July 2018, a group of researchers discovered at the site a rib fragment from a North Atlantic right whale dated from 180 A.D. 396 A.D. They suggest that the Romans may have conducted industrial-scale whaling in the coasts of the Western Mediterranean.

== See also ==
- Lixus
- Tingis
- Septem
- Rusadir
- Sala Colonia
- Mauretania Tingitana
- Christian Berbers

== Bibliography ==
- El Azifi, M.R. L'habitat ancien de la vallée de Martil in "Revue de la Faculté des lettres de Tétouan", année 4, n° 4 Tetouan, 1990
