= Iulia Constantia Zilil =

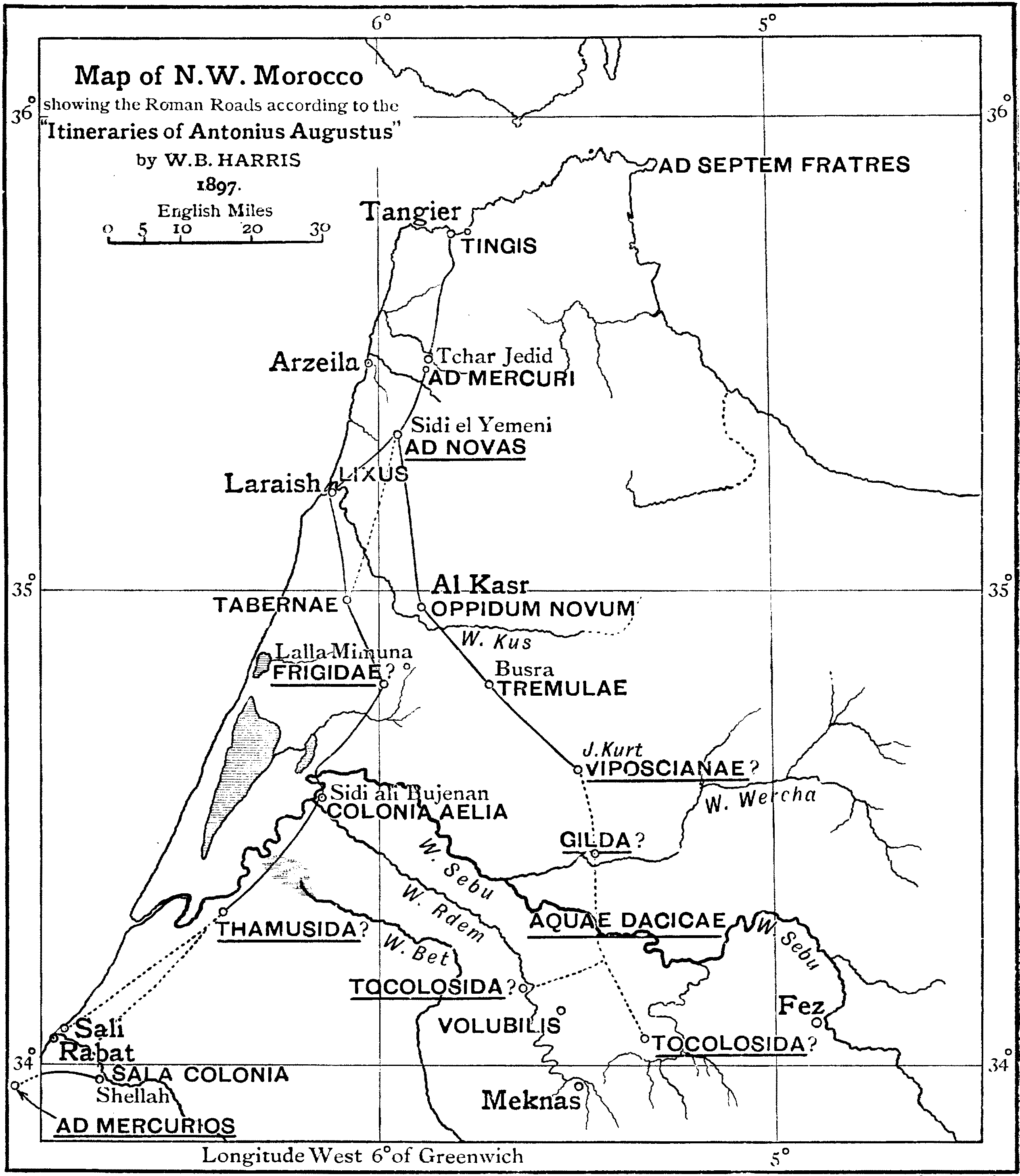
- Late 19th-century reconstruction of Roman roads in Morocco. Arzeila = Iulia Constantia Zilil

- Location within Morocco
- 35°31′17″N 5°54′57″W
- Location: Morocco
- Region: Tanger-Tetouan-Al Hoceima

Iulia Constantia Zilil (called later Arzeila) was an ancient Roman-Berber city in Dchar Jdid, located 40 km southwest of Tangier and 13 km northeast of Asilah. It was one of the three colonias in Mauretania Tingitana (in northern Morocco) founded by emperor Augustus between 33 and 25 BC for veterans of the battle of Actium.

== History ==
Iulia Constantia Zilil was originally one of many western Berber towns in the province of Mauretania Tingitana.

The old church is the only one found in Atlantic Morocco, and was related to Christian adherence among Romanised Berbers.

But evidences show that the city remained populated as a small fishing village until the Arab invasion in the early 8th century.

== See also ==
- Church of Iulia Constantia Zilil
- Iulia Valentia Banasa
- Iulia Campestris Babba
- Lixus
- Tingis
- Roman roads in Morocco

== Sources ==
- Eliane Lenoir, "Fouilles de Dchar Jedid", 1977–1980, B.A.M., XIV, 1981–1982, p. 169-225. (Akerraz et alii).
- Eliane Lenoir, "La ville romaine de Zilil du Ier av IVe siècle ap. J.-C., dans L'afrique romaine, Iersiècle av. J.-C - début Ve siècle ap. J.-C., colloque de la SOPHAU", Pallas, 68, 2005, p. 65-76.
