= Olwen Brogan =

British archaeologist (1900–1989)

- Born: 15 December 1900
- Died: 18 December 1989 (aged 89); Cambridge, England
- Education: University College London
- Scientific career
- Fields: Archaeology
- Workplaces: University College London

Lady Olwen Phillis Frances Brogan (née Kendall; 15 December 1900 – 18 December 1989; later Hackett) was a British archaeologist and expert on Roman Libya. She attended University College London and later taught there. She was the author of two monographs, over thirty articles and was a regular reviewer for Antiquaries Journal, Antiquity and Journal of Roman Studies.

Brogan initially learned excavation techniques under Mortimer Wheeler at Verulamium and Caerleon, while her MA thesis analysed the Roman frontier in Germany and the relationship of Germanic peoples with the Roman Empire.

She was one of the leading excavators at Gergovia in 1930 which expanded knowledge of Gallic oppida, however this work was interrupted by the Second World War. Following the war, Brogan started work at Sabratha in Northern Libya, where she was the chief supervisor under the directorship of Kathleen Kenyon from 1948 to 1951. While working at Sabratha, she supervised an area of domestic housing behind the forum which became known as "Casa Brogan". Her method of excavation produced excellent stratigraphy and recording, unlike traditional colonial expeditions in North Africa, where houses tended to be cleared rather than excavated and recorded in great detail.

Brogan excavated in Libya nearly every year from the 1950s to 1974, particularly in Tripolitania at sites Lepcis Magna with John Ward-Perkins.

Brogan's largest work in Tripolitania was the interior settlement and monumental cemetery at Ghirza, creating one of the best published site of the Libyan interior. Brogan excavated the site alongside Emilio Vergera-Cafarelli and David Smith over four seasons. This work revealed structures which fit into the tradition in Roman Africa of fusing Hellenistic, Punic and Roman traditions with African ritual needs and ideologies.

She also worked in Tunisia, Algeria and Morocco and in the 1970s, Brogan produced a publication of a previously unknown 6 km long Roman linear barrier made of stone wall and bank and ditch. This was significant as it marked the continuation of frontier earthworks already known in Tunisia.

Between 1969 and 1974, Brogan was appointed as the first Honorary Secretary for the Society for Libyan Studies. In 1984, the Society organised a conference in her honour, resulting in the publication of 'Town and Country in Roman Tripolitania: Papers in honour of Olwen Hackett'.

== Brogan Collection ==
The Olwen Brogan Collection, a collection of Brogan's work relating to her work in North Africa and France, is in the archives of the British Institute for Libyan and Northern African Studies, which is housed at the University of Leicester.

== Published works ==
- Brogan. O. 1933. The new battle of Georgovia. Antiquity 7:216-19.
- Brogan. O. 1934, An introduction to the Roman land frontier in Germany. Greece and Rome 3-4: 23–30.
- Brogan. O. 1935. The Roman ‘limes’ of Germany. Archaeological Journal 92: 1-41.
- Brogan, O. 1936. Trade between the Roman Empire and the free Germans. Journal of Roman studies 26: 195-222
- Brogan, O. 1953. Roman Gaul. London.
- Brogan, O 1954. The camel in Roman Tripolitania. Papers of the British School at Rome 22:126-31
- Brogan, O. 1955. When the home guard of Libya created security and fertility on the desert frontier: Ghirza in the third century A.D. Obelisk and temple tombs of Imperial Roman date near Ghirza. (Two articles) in The Illustrated London News 22 January 1955: 138-42 and 29 January 1955: 182-85
- Brogan, O. 1962. A Tripolitanian centenarian. In Hommages à Albert Grennier (Collection Latomus 58): 368–73.
- Brogan, O. 1964. The Roman Remains in the Wadi el-Amud. Libya Antiqua 1:47-56.
- Brogan, O. 1965. Henschir el-Ausaf by Tigi (Tripolitania) and some related tombs in the Tunisian Gefara. Libya Antiqua 2: 47–56.
- Brogan, O. 1965. Notes on the Wadis Neina and Bei el-Kebir and some predesert tracks. Libya Antiqua. 2: 57–64.
- Brogan, O. 1970. British Archaeology in Libya 1943–1970. Libyan Studies 1: 6–11.
- Brogan, O. 1971. First and second century settlement in the Tripolitanian pre-desert. In F.f. Gadalla (ed.), Libya in History. Proceedings of a conference held at the Faculty of Arts, University of Libya 1968. Benghazi: 121–130.
- Brogan, O. 1971. Expedition to Tripolitania 1971. Libyan Studies 2: 10-11
- Brogan, O. 1974. The Coming of Rome and the Establishment of Roman Gaul. In S. Piggot, G., Daniel and C.McBurney (eds), France before the Romans. London: 192–219.
- Brogan, O. 1975. Round and Misurata. Libyan Studies 6: 49–58.
- Brogan, O. 1975. Inscriptions in the Libyan alphabet from Tripolitania and some notes on the tribes of the region. In J. Bynon and T. Bynon (eds), Hamito-Semitica. Mouston: 267–89.
- Brogan, O. 1976. Ghirza and Zliten, In R. Stillwell (ed.(, the Princeton Encyclopaedia of Classical Sites. Princeton: 352 and 1000–01.
- Brogan, O. 1978. Es-Sernama Bir el-Uaar: a Roman tomb in Libya. In R. Moorey and P. Parr (eds), Archaeology in the Levant. Essays for Kathleen Kenyon. Warminster: 233–37.
- Brogan, O. 1980. Hadd Hajar, a ‘clausura'; in the Tripolitanian Gebel Garian south of Asabaa. Libyan Studies 11: 45–52.
- Brogan, O and Desforges, E. 1940. Georgovia. Archaeological Journal 97: 1-36.
- Brogan, O., Hawkes, C., Desforges, E. 1935. Fouilles à Georgovie. Revue archéologique 5: 220-30
- Brogan, O. and Oates, D. 1953. Gasr el-Gezira, a shrine in the Gebel Nefusa of Tripolitania. Papers of the British School at Rome 21: 74–80.
- Brogan, O. and Reynolds, J. M. 1964. Inscriptions from the Tripoitanian hinterland. Libya Antiqua 1:43-46.
- Brogan, O. and Reynolds, J.M. 1985. An inscription from the Wadi Antar. In Buck, D.J. and Mattingly, D.J. (eds). 1985. Town and Country in Roman Tripolitania. Papers in honour of Olwen Hackett. BAR S 274, Oxford: 13–23.
- Brogan, O. and Smith, D.J. 1957. The Roman frontier at Ghirza, an interim report. Journal of Roman Studies. 47: 173–84.
- Brogan, O. and Smith, D.J. 1985. Ghirza: a Romano-Libyan Settlement in Tripolitania. Libyan Antiquities Series 1. Tripoli.
- Reynolds, J.M., Brogan, O. and Smith, D. 1958. Inscriptions in the Libyan alphabet from Ghirza in Tripolitania. Antiquity32: 112–115.
- Vita-Finzi, C. and Brogan, O. 1965. Roman dams on the Wadi Megenin. Libya Antiqua 2: 65–71.
