= Ancient Berber religion =

Beliefs and deities of the ancient Berbers

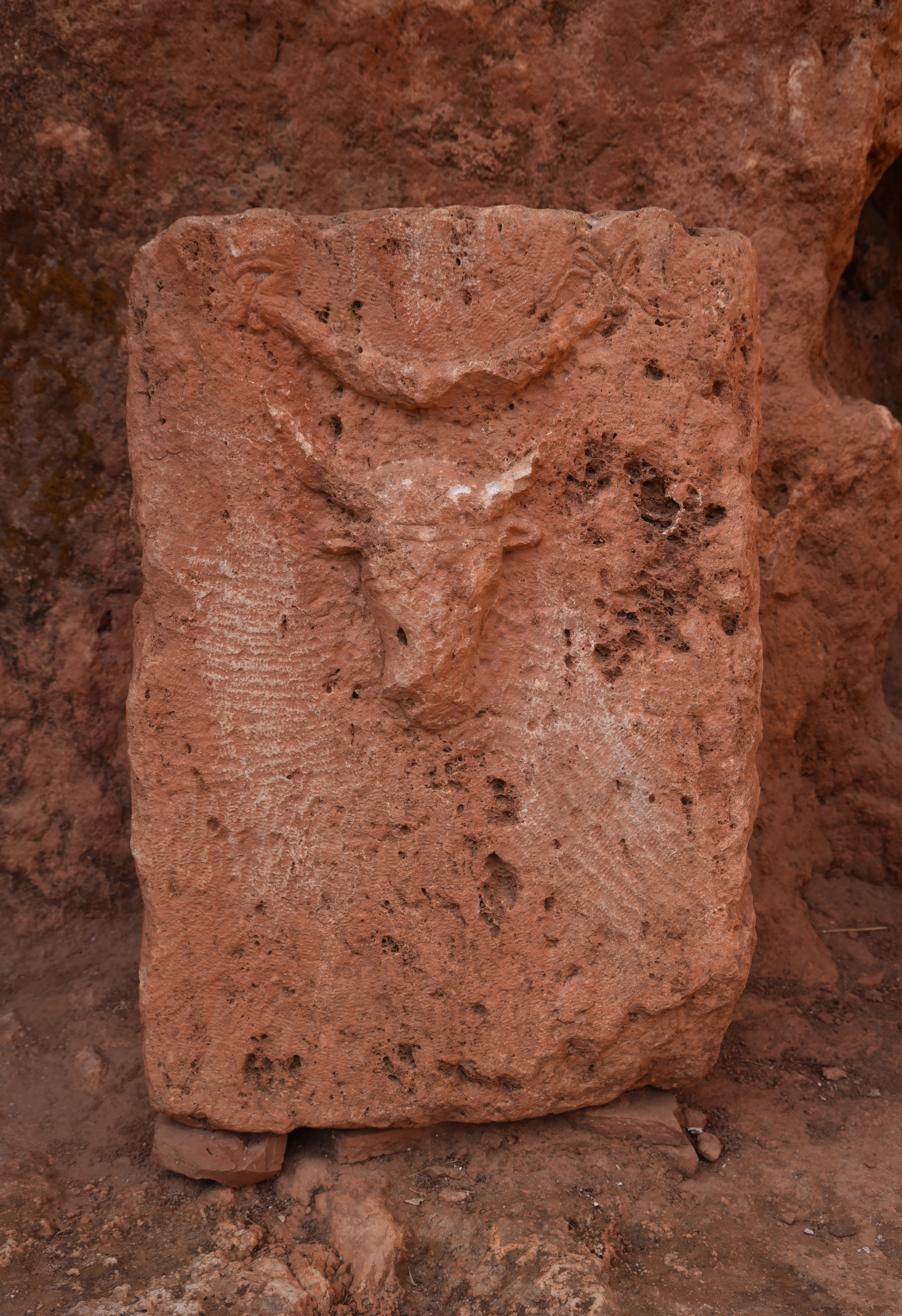
Bovine symbol (possibly Gurzil) on a tombstone in Tiddis.

The ancient Berber religion (also called Libyco-Berber religion or Amazigh religion, or Numidian religion) included various sets of beliefs and deities of the Berbers (or Amazighs) and related ethnic groups within Northwest Africa. It influenced and was somewhat influenced by the beliefs of the other peoples of the Mediterranean including but not limited to ancient Egyptians, Punics, Greeks, and Romans.

In areas of the Maghreb in which agriculture could be practiced, rain and water sources played important parts within local belief systems. Worship of spirits living in caverns and grottos was common. For example, worship of the fertility goddess related to caverns, Ifru (Africa), was widespread in coastal Algeria. In other, more pastoral areas such as Libya, worship of the sun and moon were common, though these were also present in areas such as Morocco and Algeria. Berber groups across the region also practiced ancestor worship.

The Christianization of Rome pushed animistic and polytheistic Berber beliefs out of urban areas, though total evangelization failed, and after the Muslim conquest of the Maghreb, the traditional Berber religion and local Christianity gradually disappeared. Elements of the ancient Berber beliefs still exist today subtly within the Berber popular culture and tradition.

== Pantheon ==
List of deities in Libyco-Berber religion:

Divinity	Divinity of	Cult Centers
Baal Hammon	Underworld Sky	Jebel Boukornine Cirta Timgad
Tanit	War Civilization Fertility	Thinissut (Bir Bouregba,Tunisia) Cirta (Constantine) Lambaesis (Batna) Theveste (Tebessa).
Gurzil	War	Numidia, Mauretania
Anzar	Sky Water Rain	Numidia, Mauretania
Africa	Fertility Caves	Timgad El Djem (Thysdrus)
Atlas	Mountains Endurance	Ancient Libya
Nanna Tala	Fertility	Jado (Fess’at’u), Libya
Tafukt	Sun	Numidia, Mauretania
Ayyur	Moon	Numidia, Mauretania
Sinifere (Canapphari)	War	Bu Njem, Tripolitania.
Fudina (Vihinam)	Childbirth	Numidia, Carthage
Lilleo (from the berber word Lilu meaning "Shining", "clean")	Hygiene	Numidia, Carthage
Macvrgvm (From the berber word MKR "Mokran = Big")	War Serpents	Numidia, Carthage
Draco	Serpents	Numidia, Carthage
Tisianes/Titanes	Healing	Numidia, Carthage
Settut	Magic	Kabylia

=== Tafukt & Ayyur ===
According to Herodotus, all ancient Berbers worshipped the moon and sun (Tafukt in Tamazight) and sacrificed solely to them. (Note: "They begin with the ears of the animal, which they cut off and throw over their house: this done, they kill the animal by twisting the neck. They sacrifice it to the Sun and Moon, but not to any other deities. This worship is common to all the Libyans.") In Berber, the Moon (Ayyur in Tamazight) and the god of the moon carry the same name. Masinissa, the first king of Numidia, commonly paid tribute to the sun god Apollo in 179 B.C to his temple in Delos, the assumed birthplace of Apollo and his twin sister Artemis (the goddess of the moon), for which he received a golden crown from the inhabitants of the Greek island Delos. (Note: A statue of Masinissa was set up in Delos in honour of him as well as an inscription dedicated to him in Delos by a native from Rhodes. His sons too had statues of them erected on the island of Delos and the King of Bithynia, Nicomedes, had also dedicated a statue to Masinissa.) Tullius Cicero (105–43 BCE) also reported the same cult in On the Republic (Scipio's Dream):

When I (Scipio) was introduced to him, the old man (Massinissa, king of Massyle) embraced me, shed tears, and then, looking up to heaven, exclaimed I thank thee, O supreme Sun, and you also, you other celestial beings, that before I departed from this life I behold in my kingdom, and in my palace, Publius Cornelius Scipio.

Further authors such as Apuleius or Augustine of Hippo mention that sun worship continued into the first millennium and the seventh century. Coptic saint Samuel the Confessor appears to have been harassed by the sun-worshiping Berbers who tried unsuccessfully to force him to worship the sun.

Some Latin inscriptions were found in Northwest Africa dedicated to the sun-god. An example is the inscription found in Souk Ahras (the birthplace of Augustine; Thagaste in Algeria) written "Solo Deo Invicto". The megalithic culture may have been part of a cult of the dead or of star-worship.

=== The cult of Amon and rams ===
Also called African Saturn and Baal Hammon. Since antiquity, the ancient Libyans (Berbers inhabiting ancient Libya) worshipped the god Amon, who was also worshipped by the Ancient Egyptians. According to Herodotus and Pausanias, the cult had Berber origin and later spread to Egypt and then Greece, probably via the Greek colony of Cyrene. In the Siwa Oasis, located in Western Egypt, there remained a solitary oracle of Amon near the Libyan Desert.

Amon's wife Amunet is also believed to have originated from Libya. She is the Egyptian mythological goddess of the underworld. Amentet (meaning the "Land of the Setting Sun" or "The West") is where the dead wait for Ra to arrive.

In Berber beliefs, the sheep was a sacred animal to Amun. In the discussion of Athanase of Alexandria against the Gentiles, it is said that for the Libyan populations (Berbers), the god Amun is often named Amen and was venerated as a divinity. Iarbas, a mythological king of Numidia who sold Dido the land on which she founded Carthage, was also considered a son of Amun. Another famous son of Ammon is the Berber god of war Gurzil.

In Algeria, When a sheep gave birth to a female, this fruit of her womb belonged to the master of the flock; when she gave birth to a male, he was reserved for the gods; but, if she gave two twins at the same time, one female and the other male, it was said: "The latter has redeemed her brother," and the lamb was not slain, and the mother was called ousila.

Diodorus Siculus mentions Ammon as the king of Libya who married Rhea (daughter of Uranus and sister of the Titans). According to him he fell in love with a "maiden of unusual beauty": Amaltheia with whom he fathered Dionysus. According to other stories, Dionysus was the son of Zeus. The Egyptian version of Amun was often identified by the Greeks to be Zeus.

=== War Goddess Tanit ===
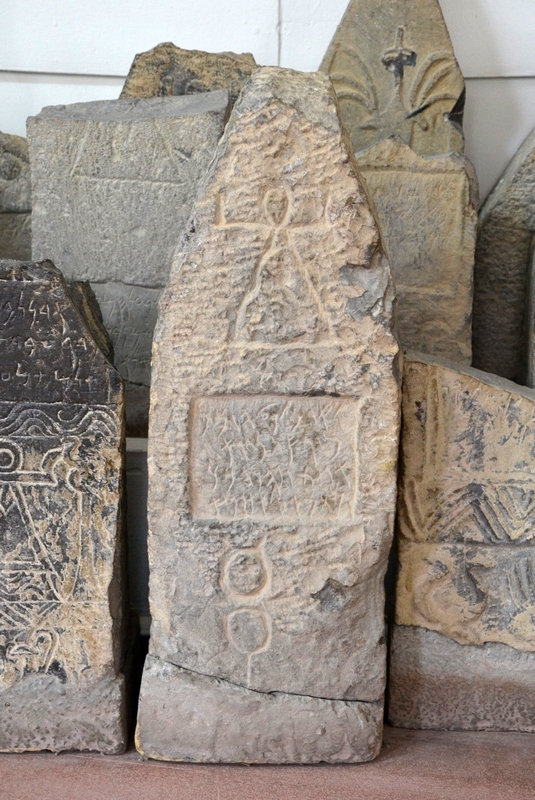
Funerary Stele with the sign of Tanit found in Cirta, Algeria.

The ancient cult of Neith (Ha-nit) (or Nit, or Tinnit) influenced the ancient Egyptians with their goddess Neith, and the Hellenes with their goddess Athena through the Berber cult of war, and was an imported deity from Libya who was in wide worship in 600 BC in Sais (Archaic name: Ha-Nit) by the Libyan population inhabiting Sais, a temple of Neith was established in this city by the earliest local dynasty. Neith is the direct predecessor to Athena as follows:

Above the Kerameikos [in Athens] and the portico called the King's Portico is a temple of Hephaistos. I was not surprised that by it stands a statue of Athena, because I knew the story about Erikhthonios. But when I saw that the statue of Athena had blue eyes I found out that the legend about them is Libyan. For the Libyans have a saying that the Goddess is the daughter of Poseidon and Lake Tritonis, and for this reason has blue eyes like Poseidon.

— Pausanias, Description of Greece

The Libyan Amazons are without doubt part of this cult. Athena, imposed the Amazons of Libya in Troy and in Greece, the Libyan Amazons remained in the village of Tenæ at the south of Sfax and Cartenæ (Tenes).

According to mythology, Athena was believed to have been born in Lake Tritonis in North Africa (modern-day Algeria and Tunisia), which is why she was given the epithet Tritogeneia. In one version of the story she is the daughter of Poseidon and Tritonis, a Libyan lake nymph, and as the same source adds, after a disagreement with her father, she gave herself to Zeus, who made her his own daughter, which explains why both are considered gods of horses.

In his dialogue Timaeus, the Greek philosopher Plato has Critias claim that Neith is the Egyptian name of Athena. Some identified the Punic Tanit as the Middle Eastern goddesses like Anat or Astarte but Steve A. Wiggins argued that "local associations should not be considered definitive" and that "we must not assert more than the evidence will allow".

=== Africa ===
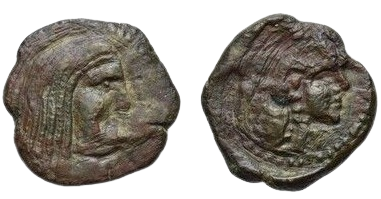
On the left, the bust of Hierbas, on the right, the head of Africa, wearing an elephant skin headdress.

Africa (Tamazight: Ifri/Ifru) was a goddess of fertility and abundance worshipped by the Berbers and the tribe of Ifri. Her iconography typically included an elephant-mask headdress, a cornucopia, a military standard, and a lion. the Latin designation (Africa) originally meant the land of the Afri was also known from the Berber word ifri (plural ifran) meaning "cave". To the Berbers, Africa was a deity associated with caves which were her main places of worship, coins and other materials depicting this deity were discovered mainly in Algeria in Albulae (Aïn Temouchent) and in Guechguech, 16 km east of Constantine. She was later included in the roman pantheon and became the personification of the region of Africa Proconsularis and later the name used for the entire continent of Africa.

=== Gurzil ===
Gurzil, the son of the god Ammon and a heipher, he appears in later texts and is worshipped by tribes such as the Austoriani outside the Roman frontiers of Libya. He was considered a war god and was taken by the Berbers to their battles against the Byzantines. Corippus mentioned that the chiefs of the Laguata took their god Gurzil into battle against the Byzantines and Arabs. It is very likely that the sanctuary of Gurzil was located in Ghirza, in Libya, where remarkable reliefs show a noble Libyan receiving tribute while seated on a curule chair. The temple was in use well into the sixth century. He is presumed to be a god of the sun or a god associated with battles. He is usually identified with bulls.

=== Atlas ===
Atlas is a Greek Titan commonly associated with the Atlas Mountains in North Africa and the borders of Ancient Libya. (Note: "away by the boundary of Libya my father still suffers hardship, old Atlas with chafing shoulders bowed, upholding the seven-zoned vault of the sky.") Nonnus calls in Dionysiaca (13.333) both Athena and her matrilineal grandfather Atlas "Libyan". Maximus of Tyre mentions the mountains as a deity of the Libyans.

To the people there [Libyans in the West] the Atlas is a sanctuary and an idol. […] It is at the same time the sanctuary, the god, the bond of oaths and the idol of the Libyans.

— Maximus of Tyre, On images for the gods

In an interpretation of the ancient sources, he is seen as the first king of Mauretania which was popularized by Gerardus Mercator who coined the term "atlas" based on Atlas of Mauretania.

=== Triton ===
Herodotus claims that Poseidon originated from Libya. According to him the Libyans at Lake Tritonis also worshiped Triton. Triton might have been a more local deity or may be related to Poseidon. He was also linked to Tritonis, the mother of Athena, as a potential female counterpart.

=== Other deities ===
Corippus mentions Sinifere, who was described as a god of war worshiped by the Eastern Libyans but might have been a "tribal god". Mastiman (or Autiman) was also mentioned by him and was also identified as god of war and was later associated with Mercury. Other divinities are:

Dii Maurii
Divinity Name	Divinity of	Cult Centers
Abbadir	(Alternative name to Baal Hammon)	Manliana
Aenon	?	Avedda (Henchir Bedd) Medjez El Bab
Avislava (berbère AWL)	Fertility	Bavares, Pomaria (Tlemcen), Ain Khial, Volubilis
Avzivs	Genus	Aumale (Sour el-Ghozlan)
Bacax	Caves	Constantine (Montagnes Taya and Chettaba), Guelma
Baldir/Baliddir	Agriculture of harvest (Threshing floor)	Sigus, Bir Tlelsa, Guelaat bou Sba, Cirta
Bonchor	Wars of defence	Vaga
Boccuri	Similar to the name of the Amazigh Pharao Tanis that the Greeks call Bocchoris	Vaga
Canapphari (Sinefere)	War	Tripoli
Slug	?	Madauros (Africa Proconsularis)
Cillenus	Messages	Timgad
Damio	Agriculture	Madauros (Africa Proconsularis), Thugga
Draco	Serpents	Caesarea in Mauretania, Cirta, Ain Guellaa (Thignica), Numluli (Africa Proconsularis), Aquae Flavianae
Fudina	Childbirth	Henchir Ramdan (Africa Proconsularis)
Gda	Caves	Phua (Numidia), Constantine (Chettaba Montagne)
Haos	?	Ksiba
Iemsal	Linked to Hiempsal I	Tiklat (Mauretania Caesariensis)
Ieru (Ayyur)	Moon (Ayyur), Caves (Linked to other deities called Gda and Bacax)	Guechguech (Numidia)
Iesdan	?	Magifa (Ksar el-boum)
Ingirozoglezim	Genius	Vanisnesi (Hasnaoua)
Iocolon	Genius	Naraggara (Sidi Youssef (Kerkennah))
Iuba	Son of Jupiter	Vanisnesi (Hasnaoua)
Irsiti	Depiction of Herakles	Aïn Reggada
Ivnam	Dioscuri, Chevaux (Divinity of horseriding)	Vaga
Maevii	?	Tébessa
Macvrtam/Vacurtum (De berbère MKRD)	Chevaux (Divinity of Horseriding)	Henchir Ramdan
Masgav	?	Dougga, Altava
Masi	Massinissa made into divinity	Abizar
Masiden	?	Magifa (Ksar el Boum)
Masiddice	?	Magifa (Ksar el Boum)
Mastiman	Related to Pluto	Tripoli
Mathamodis	Priestess	Mascula (Khenchla)
Matilam	Deity of sacrifice of mutton	Vaga
Midmanim	?	Caesarea
Monna (nom berbère Monn)	?	Tignica
Montivs	Mountain deity	Timgad
Motmanio	Related to Mercury	Lambaesis
Sesase	Genius	Thuburnica
Suggan	Deity of a specific mountain in southern Numidia (Mons Suggarem)	Magifa (Ksar el Boum), Chlef
Thililua	Femenine form of Lilleo	Magifa (Ksar el Boum)
Tisianes	Divinity of herbal incantations and healing	-
Vacurtum (Macurtum)	Horses (Divinity of Horseriding)	Vaga
Vanammon	Alternative of 'Ammon'	Golas
Varriccala	Pluto	Thabarca
Varsis (Sima)	?	Vaga
Varsissima	Female deity of War	Vaga
Vihinam	Childbirth	Vaga

== Creation myths ==
There are two myths that explain the origin of creation of the world still present in Amazigh story telling and common culture to this day, the first narrates the story of "The Origin of the Sheep and the Division of the Year", it explains how the First Mother of the World created, from flour and water, the first sheep, which then only had to multiply to the end of their lives, with the exception of the first created one who did not die like the others; he had indeed climbed a very high mountain until he hit the sun with his horns. Since then, this ram has been spinning with the star, the ball of the sun clinging to its horns.

In the second myth, "The Origin of the Sun and the Moon", the sun is created from a lesion on the eyelid of a lamb, taken and thrown into the fire by the First Mother of the World. (It should be noted in passing that the sheep's eyelid is also used in marriage rites among the N'tifa, where the matron takes a piece of it and puts it as a necklace for the bride.) The lamb contemplated the fire and saw the sun come out of it and rise to the sky

== Death customs ==
=== Funerary practices ===
The tombs of the early people and their ancestors indicate that the Berbers and their ancestors (the Capsians and Ibero-Mauresians) believed in an afterlife. The prehistoric people of northwest Africa buried bodies in little holes. When they realized that bodies buried in unsecured holes were dug up by wild animals, they began to bury them in deeper ones. Later, they buried the dead in caves, tumuli, tombs in rocks, mounds, and other types of tombs.

Unlike the majority of mainland Berbers, the Guanche mummified their dead. Additionally, in 1958 University of Rome Professor Fabrizio Mori (1925–2010) discovered a Libyan mummy in Uan Muhuggiag around 5,500 years old—roughly a thousand years older than any known Ancient Egyptian mummy.

=== Megalithic culture ===
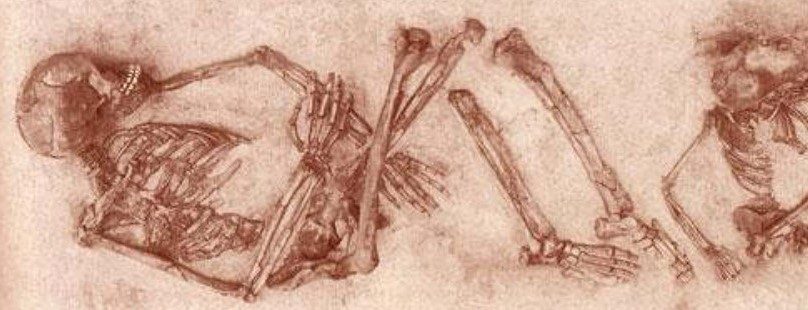
Skeletons of prehistoric buried Mother and her baby in a dolmen in Algeria.

Archaeological research on prehistoric tombs in the Maghreb shows that the bodies of the dead were painted with ochre. While this practice was known to the Iberomaurusians, this culture seems to have been primarily a Capsian industry. The dead were also sometimes buried with shells of ostrich eggs, jewellery, and weapons. Bodies were usually buried in a fetal position. In North Africa in 13,000 BC lived the Ibero-mauresian man, archaeologists have traced their origins to the Caspian culture, a North African civilization that dates back more than 10,000 years.

It is a culture that dominated in North Africa, between 13,000 BC and the foundation of Numidia, several sub-cultures emerged and evolved and all of which were called Megalithic cultures, the word Megalithic describes an era where ancient monuments built before the invention of early writing in 3,200 BC. Megalithic Tombs (also called Dolmens), were monuments built as burial sites for ancient Berbers, megaliths are huge tombs underground to bury the dead and they come in several shapes.

There exists more than 32,000 Dolmens across Algeria, including for instance the slopes of Djebel Mazela in Bounouara, the site of the necropolis of Sigus (which includes dolmens, menhirs and cromlechs), as well as the important necropolis of Djelfa. The region with the highest concentration of Dolmens is Roknia where over 3,000 megalithic monuments in the necropolis stretch over several kilometers (in comparison, there are more than 4,000 on the whole of France). They are present in large numbers in eastern Algeria and Tunisia and are characterized by their quadrangular plan.

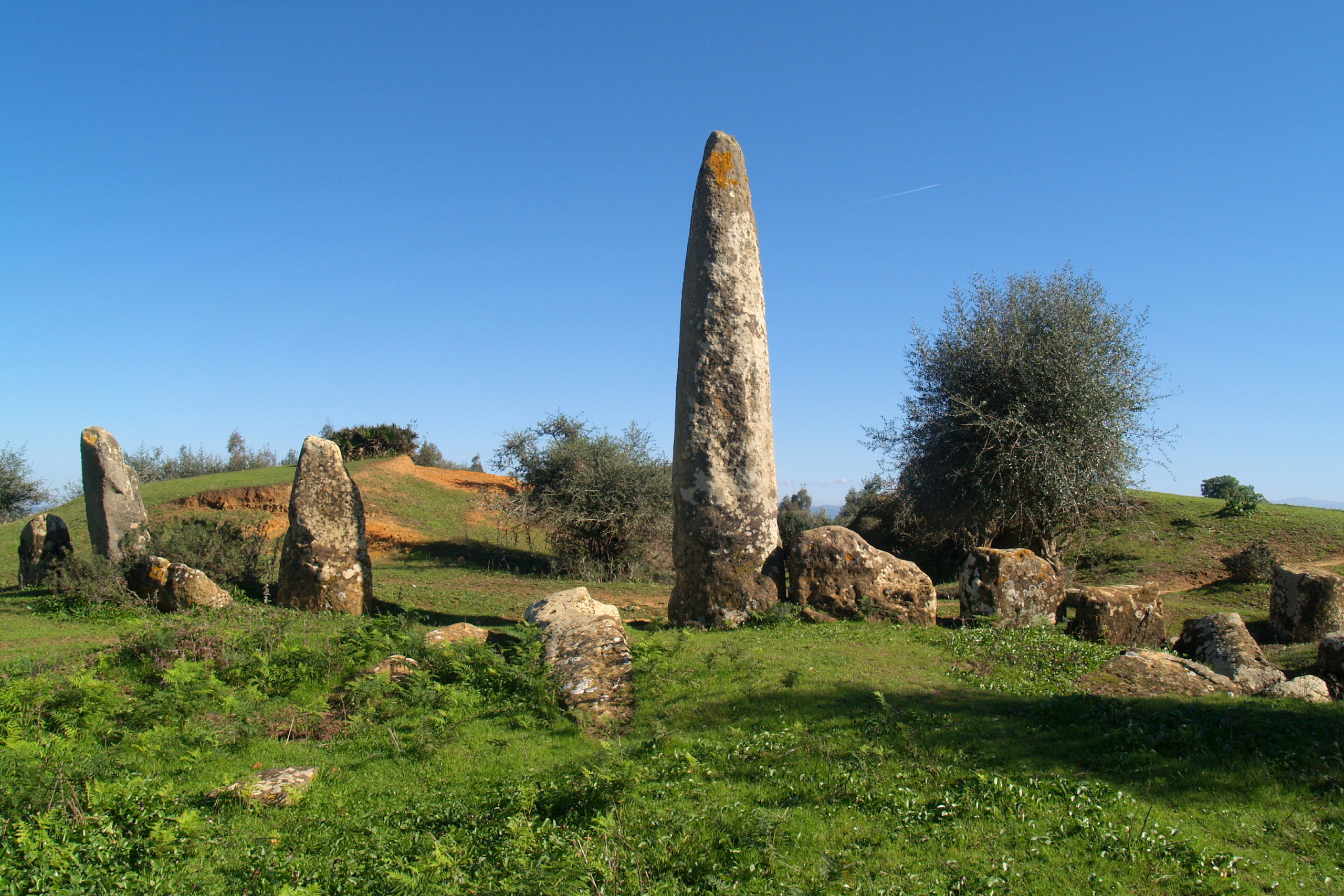
Burial site of Antaeus, in M'soura Morocco.

The monument of Msoura is one of the best-known megalithic monuments in north-west Africa. It is composed of a circle of megaliths surrounding a tumulus, the highest of which is over 5 meters (16 ft). According to legend, it is the tomb of the Libyan king Anti (known by the Greeks as the giant Antaeus, an opponent of Heracles). The tomb was venerated by Berbers who went for pilgrimage to the ancient prehistoric monument.Another megalithic monument was discovered in 1926 to the south of Casablanca. The monument was engraved with funerary inscriptions in the Berber script known as Tifinagh.

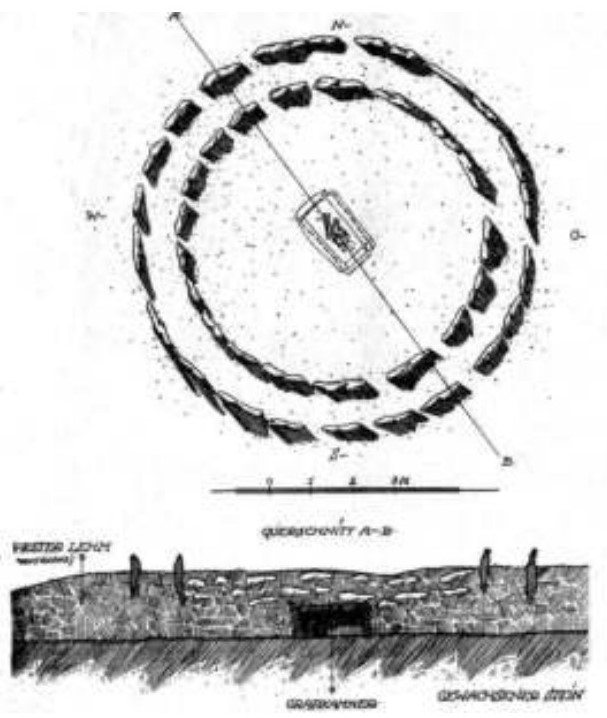
Dolmen in Bechar from 6,000 BC, Algeria with a burial chamber built inside the hill.

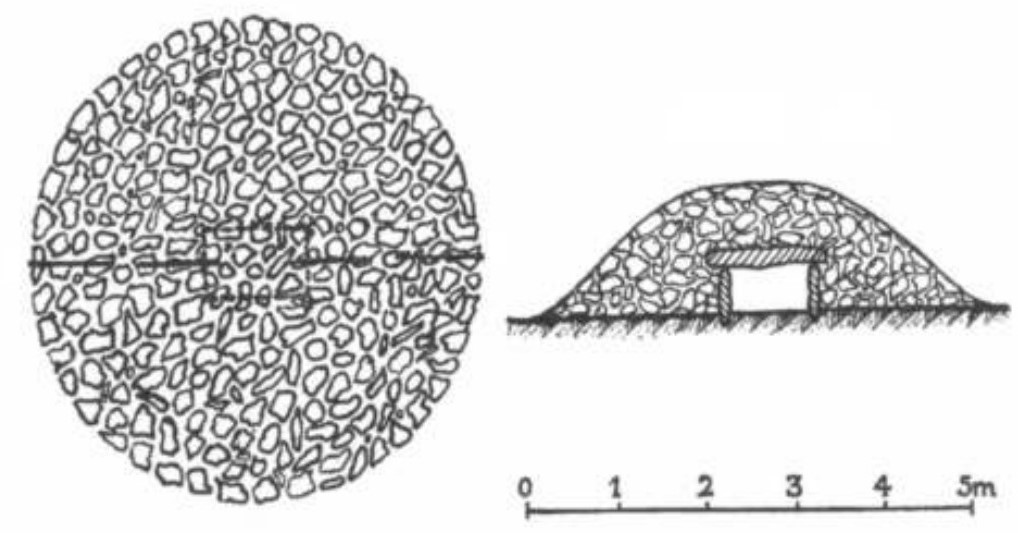
Dolmen in Aïn Séfra, Algeria dating back to 7,100 BC.

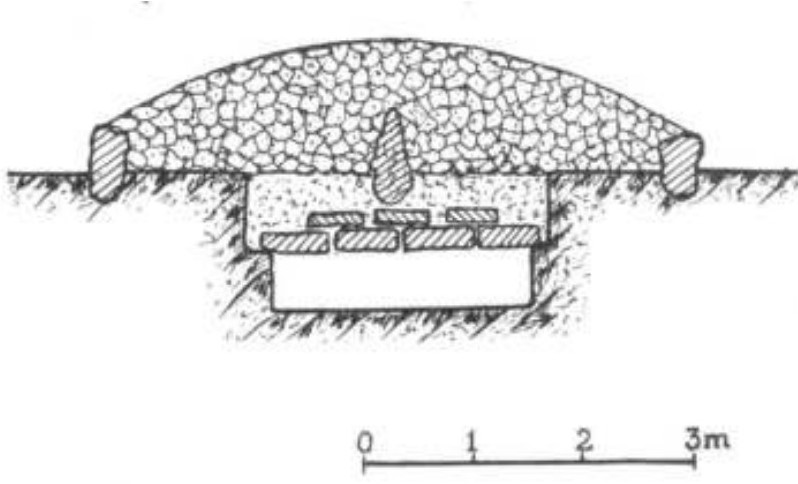
Dolmen found in Boghar region of Medea in central Algeria from 5,600 BC.

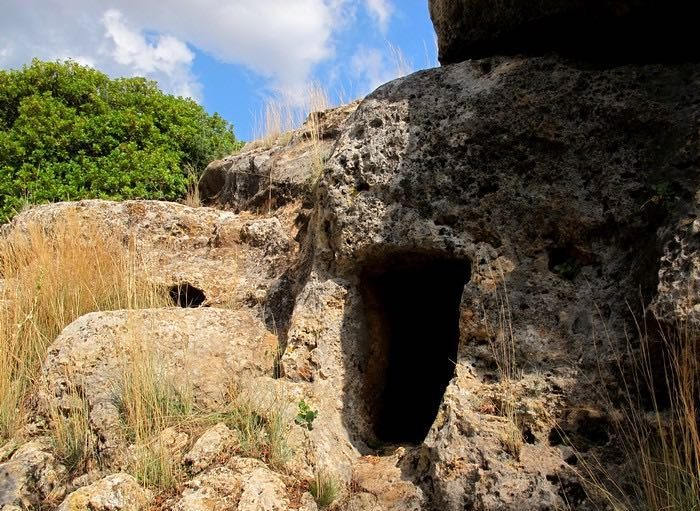
Dolmen Discovered in Roknia from 10,000 BC.

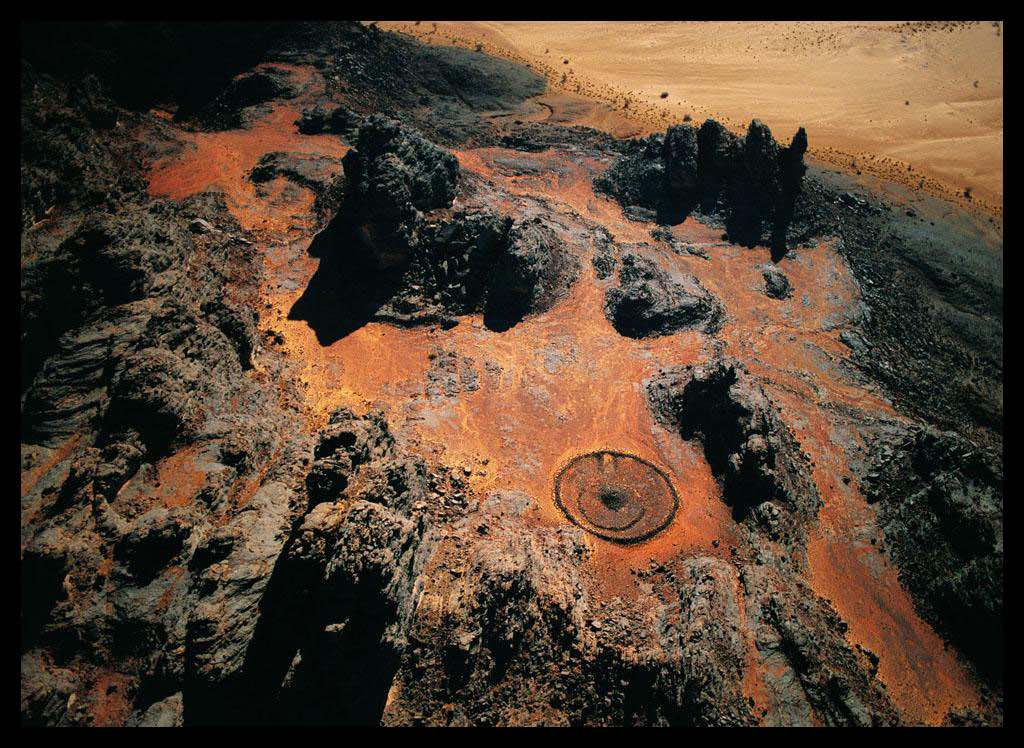
Dolmen in Tassili sépulture dating back to 12,000 BC.

=== Ancient Berber tombs ===
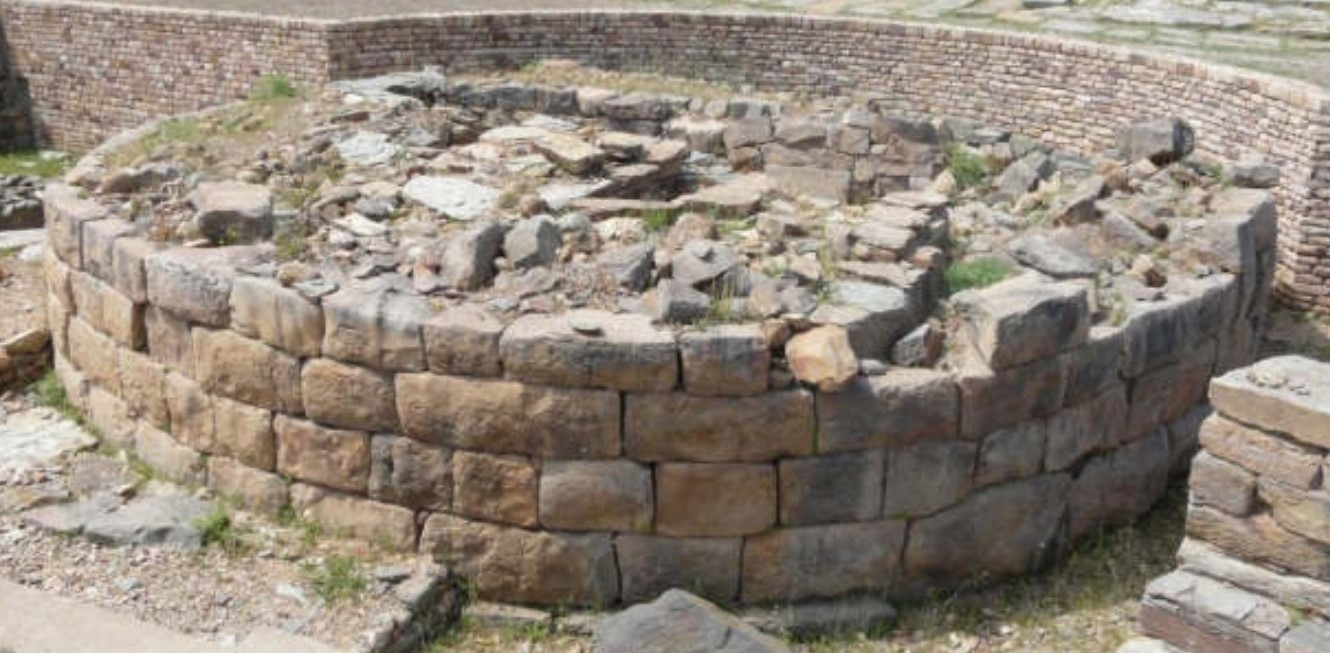
Bazina discovered in Sigus, Western Algeria.

After the development of architecture in North Africa in early history improvement from the dolmens began to be heavily considered by ancient Berbers, more regular and improved designs of tombs were invented known as Bazinas. The term bazina comes from the Berber word meaning mound. The bazinas are built of dry stone. Their upper part is often domed or a truncated cone.

Access to the burial chamber is invisible. The deceased is buried on the ground and covered by a projecting funerary structure. Bazinas are found in the vicinity of Chellala and Tamda, in Algeria and in the north-west of Tunisia, for example in Balta Bou Aouène, near Bou Salem, as well as in the Meknes region of Morocco with the Gour bazina.

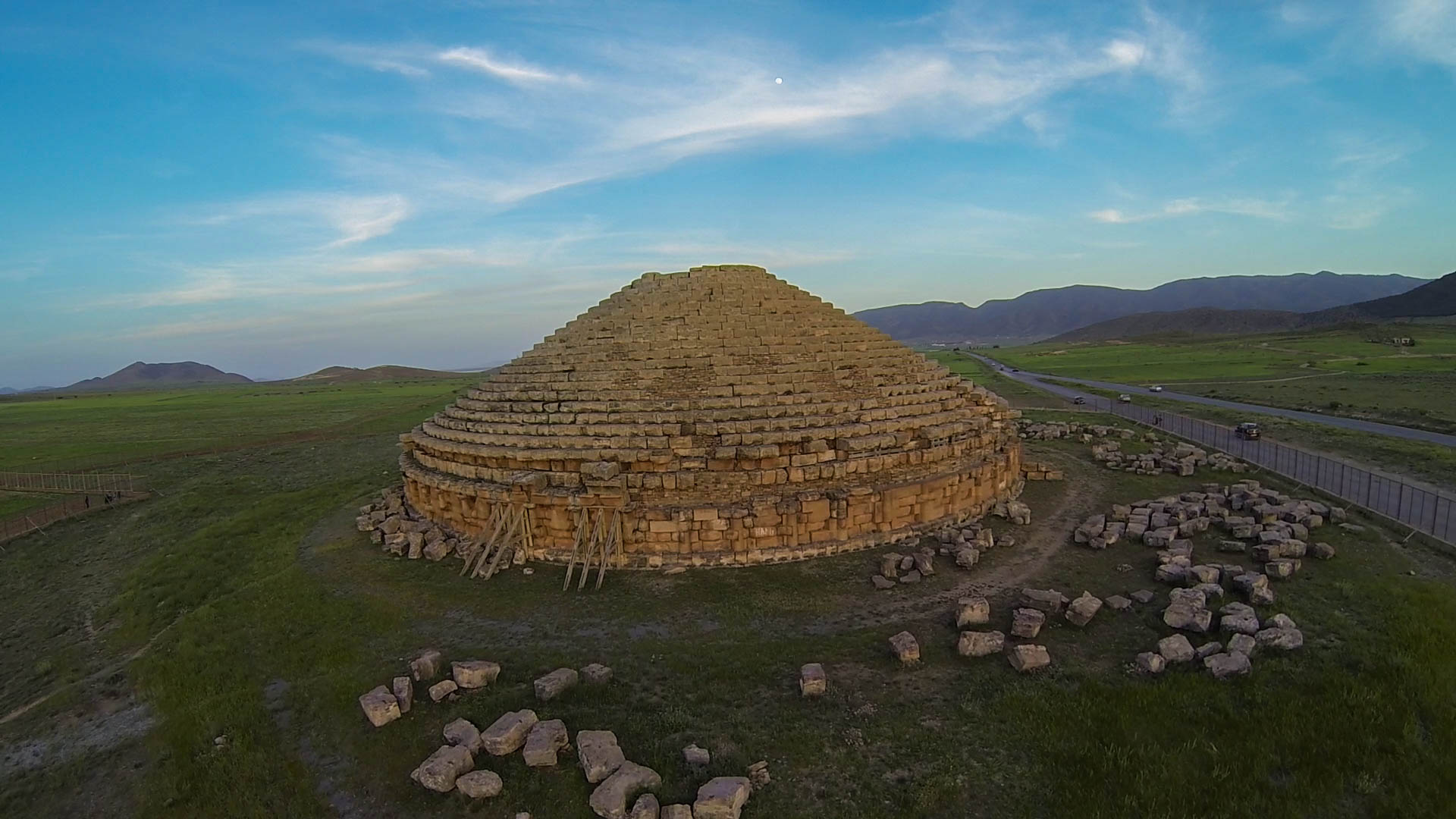
The mausoleum of Madghacen in Batna.

These tombs evolved from primitive structures to much more elaborate ones, such as the pyramidal tombs spread throughout Northern Africa. The honor of being buried in such a tomb appears to have been reserved for those who were most important to their communities.

These pyramid tombs have attracted the attention of some scholars, such as Mohamed Chafik who wrote a book discussing the history of several of the tombs that have survived into modern times. He tried to relate the pyramidal Berber tombs with the great Egyptian pyramids on the basis of the etymological and historical data. The best known Berber pyramids are the 19-meter (62 ft) pre-Roman Numidian pyramid of the Medracen and the 30-meter (98 ft) ancient Mauretanian pyramid. The Mauretanian in Tipaza is also known as Kbour-er-Roumia or Tomb of Juba and Sypax, mistranslated by the French colonists as Tomb of the Christian Woman. The Tomb holds the graves of King Juba II and Queen Cleopatra Selene II, the rulers of Mauretania.

=== Crescent religious symbolism ===
The crescent was a widespread religious and funerary symbol in ancient North Africa. Archaeological evidence demonstrates that crescent motifs appeared on Libyco-Berber and Punic stelae and other religious monuments across Numidia and Mauretania, where they formed part of indigenous astral iconography.

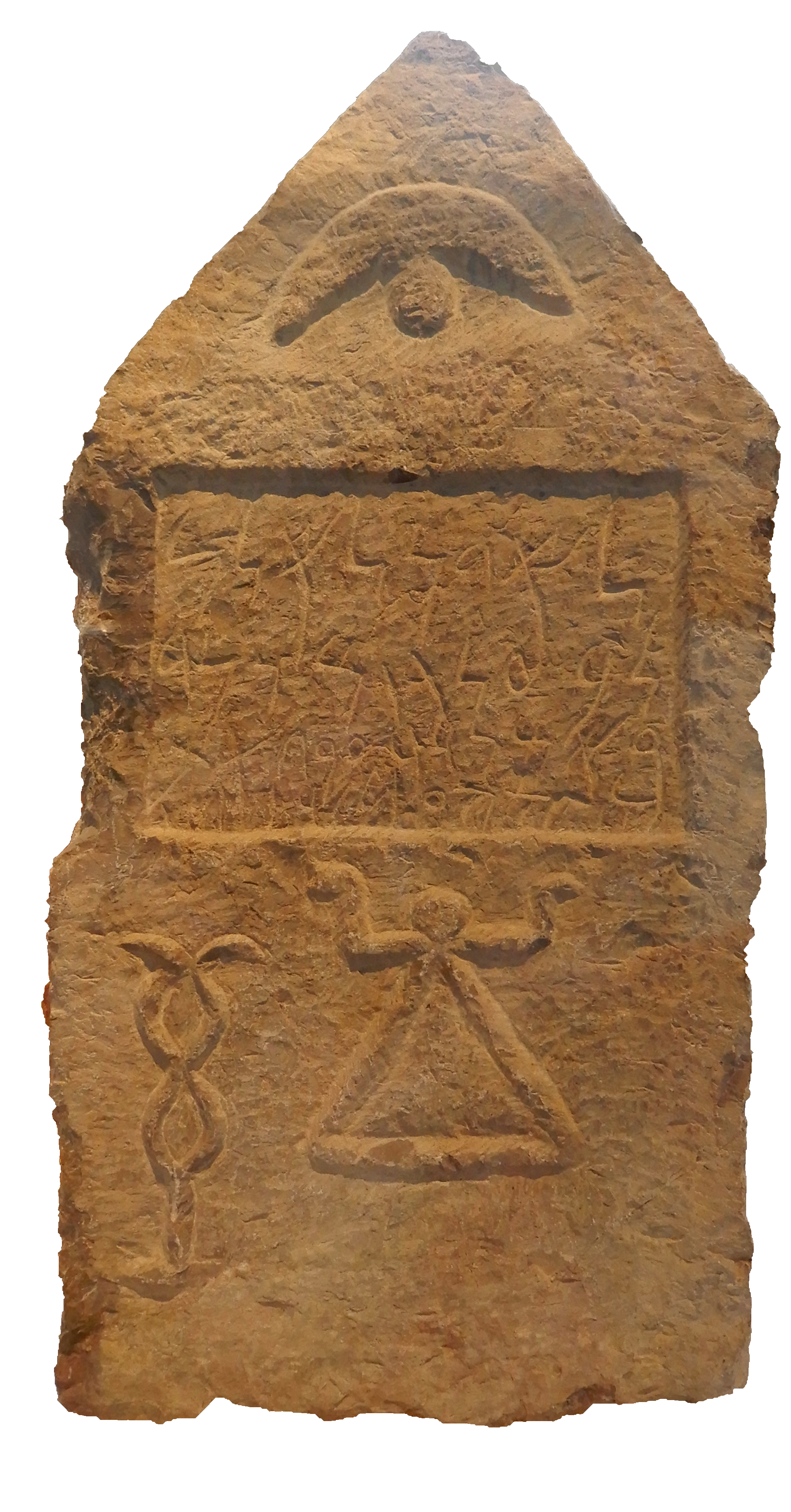
Funerary Cirta stele presented in Louvre museum taken during the colonial period, showcasing the crescent symbol.

According to one of the foremost specialists on Berber archaeology Gabriel Camps, the crescent was gradually adopted by the Libyans (Berbers) and later by the independent Numidian kingdoms. He notes that the distribution of crescent-bearing stelae extends throughout Numidia, including sites such as Cirta steles, Milev, Tiddis, Rusicade, Cuicul (Djemila), Lambaesis and Thamugadi (Timgad).

The symbol remained prominent during the Roman period, appearing on votive and funerary monuments dedicated to Saturn, the Roman interpretation of the deity Baal Hammon. Nacéra Benseddik describes the African Saturn as a synthesis of the Libyco-Punic Baal Hammon and the Roman Saturn, reflecting continuity between indigenous and Roman religious traditions. Gabriel Camps likewise states that Saturn unquestionably succeeded the Punic Baal Hammon in Roman North Africa.

UNESCO has recognized the exceptional importance of the funerary monuments of the Numidian kingdoms, describing them as characteristic remains of the ancient Numidian civilization and among the principal archaeological testimonies of the ancient Berbers.

Archaeologists regard the crescent itself as a much older element of Libyco-Berber and Punic religious iconography.

=== Cult of the dead ===
One of the distinguishing characteristics of the Berber religion in antiquity was the veneration of the dead, who seem to have been believed to exercise control over soil fertility and possibly over the future. Pomponius Mela also reported that the Augilae (Modern Awjila in Libya) considered the spirits of their ancestors to be deities. They swore by them and consulted them. After making requests, they slept in their tombs to await responses in dreams.

Herodotus (484 BCE–425 BCE) noted the same practice among the Nasamones, who inhabited the deserts around Siwa and Augila. He wrote:

"They swear by the people among themselves who are reported to have been the most lawful and brave, by these, I say, laying hands upon their tombs; and they divine by visiting the sepulchral mounds of their ancestors and lying down to sleep upon them after having prayed; and whatsoever thing the person sees in their dream, this they accept."

The Berbers worshiped their rulers, too. The tombs of the Numidian rulers are among the most notable monuments left by the Classical Berbers. But Gabriel Camps debates whether this is done for worship or for mere love and appreciation of the contributions of the rulers.

The veneration (not worship) of saints which exists among the modern Berbers in the form of Maraboutism—which is widespread in northwest Africa—may or may not contain traces of prior beliefs or customs concerning the dead.

== Cultural exchange ==
=== Libyan-Egyptian beliefs ===
The Ancient Egyptians were the neighbors of the Berbers, as such traces of the worship of ancient Egyptian deities by the Berbers was found, and it has been theorized that both cultures shared at least some of these gods:

The cult Isis and Set by the Berbers was reported by Herodotus when saying:

Thus from Egypt to the Tritonian lake, the Libyans are nomads that eat meat and drink milk; for the same reason as the Egyptians too profess, they will not touch the flesh of cows; and they rear no swine. The women of Cyrene too deem it wrong to eat cows' flesh, because of the Isis of Egypt; nay, they even honour her with fasts and festivals; and the Barcaean women refuse to eat swine too as well as cows.

— Herodotus, The Histories, page 391

Those Libu did not eat the flesh of swine, because it was associated with Set, while they did not eat the cattle's flesh, because it was associated with Isis.

The most remarkable common god of the Berbers and the Egyptians was Amun and Amunet. These deities are hard to attribute to only one pantheon, they were two of the greatest ancient Berber deities. They were honored by the Ancient Greeks in Cyrenaica, and was united with the Phoenician god Baal and goddess Anat due to Libyan influence. Early depictions of rams and ewes (related possibly to an early form of the cult of these deities) across North Africa have been dated to between 9600 BCE and 7500 BCE.
The most famous temple of Amun and Amunet in Ancient Libya was the augural temple at Siwa Oasis in Egypt, an oasis still inhabited by Berbers.

The Egyptians considered some Egyptian deities to have had a Libyan origin, such as Neith who has been considered by Egyptians to have emigrated from Libya to establish her temple at Sais in the Nile Delta. Some people also believe links between the way Egyptians depicted certain deities and the way they depicted Libyan people exist, such is the case for Amunet.

Osiris was also among the Egyptian deities who were venerated in Libya and Dr. E. A. Wallis Budge believed that Osiris was originally a Libyan god, saying of him that "Everything which the texts of all periods recorded concerning him goes to show that he was an indigenous god of Northern Africa (modern day Libya), and that his home and origin were possibly Libyan."

=== Phoenician-Berber beliefs ===
The Phoenicians were originally a Semitic people who inhabited the coast of modern Lebanon, and later came as refugees to Tunisia. The Phoenicians of Lebanon were seafarers and they founded Carthage in 814 BCE. They later gave birth to the so-called Punic culture, which had its roots in the Berber and Phoenician cultures. Some scholars distinguish the relationships between the Phoenicians and the Berbers in two phases:

When Phoenicians settled in Northwest Africa, they stayed in the coastal regions to avoid wars with the Berbers. They maintained their deities which they brought from their homeland. Therefore, early Carthaginians had two important Phoenician deities, Baal and Anat.

Carthage began to ally with the Berber tribes after the Battle of Himera (480 BCE), in which the Carthaginians were defeated by the Greeks. In addition to political changes, the Carthaginians imported some of the Berber deities.

Baal and Anat were the primary deities worshipped in Carthage. Depictions of these deities are found in several sites across Northern Africa. Also, the goddess Tanit and god Baal Hammon were worshipped, as Amun was a local Berber deity, so is Tannit, she represented the matriarchal aspect of Numidian society, whom the Egyptians identify as Neith and the Greeks identify as Athena. The names themselves, Baal Hammon and Tanit, have Berber linguistic structure. Some scholars believe that the Egyptian goddess Neith and Egyptian god Khnum were similar to the Libyan goddess Tanit and the Libyan god Baal Hammon. It was proposed that the Punic god Baal Hammon is a syncretic association with Amun the god of ancient Libya and the Phoenician deity Baal.

=== Greek-Libyan beliefs ===
The ancient Greeks established colonies in Cyrenaica. The Greeks influenced the eastern Libyan pantheon, but they were also influenced by Libyan culture and beliefs. Generally, the Libyan-Greek relationships can be divided into two different periods. In the first period, the Greeks had peaceful relationships with the Libyans. Later, there were wars between them. These social relationships were mirrored in their beliefs.

The first notable appearance of Libyan influence on the Cyrenaican-Greek beliefs is the name Cyrenaica itself. This name was originally the name of a legendary Thessalian warrior and queen who was known as Cyrene, ruled Thessaly in Greece and later Cyrene in Libya. Cyrene was, according to the legend, a courageous huntress and queen who hunted and ate lions and all other animals. She gave her name to the city Cyrene in Libya. The emigrating Greeks made her their protector besides their Greek god Apollo.

The Greeks of Cyrenaica also adopted some Berber customs. Herodotus (Book IV 120) reported that the Libyans taught the Greeks how to yoke four horses to a chariot (the Romans used these Libyan chariots later, after they were taught to do so by the Greeks). The Cyrenaican Greeks built temples for the Libyan deities Amun and Amunet who they identified with Zeus and Hera, respectively. Some of them continued worshipping Amun and Amunet themselves. Amun and Amunet's cult was so widespread among the Greeks that even Alexander III of Macedonia decided to be declared as the son of Amun and Amunet in the Siwan temple of Amun and Amunet by its Libyan priests.

Some ancient Greek historians, such as Herodotus, mentioned that some Greek deities were of Libyan origin. As such, Athena was supposed to have been born in Lake Tritonis where she was originally honored by the Libyans. Herodotus wrote that the Aegis and the clothes of Athena were typical for Libyan women.

Herodotus also stated that Poseidon (an important Greek water god) was adopted from the Libyans by the Greeks. He emphasized that no other people worshipped Poseidon from early times apart from the Libyans who spread his cult:

About this god the Hellenes learnt from the Libyans, for no people except the Libyans have had the name of Poseidon from the first and have paid honour to this god always.

— Herodotus, The Histories, (2.50, 4.188)

Some other Greek deities were related to Libya. The goddess Lamia was believed to have originated in Libya, like Medusa and the Gorgons. The Greeks seem also to have met the god Triton in Libya. The Hesperides were believed to be the daughters of Atlas, a god who is associated with the Atlas Mountains by Herodotus. The Atlas Mountains were worshipped by the Berbers and the Canary Islands represented the daughters of Atlas.

Some ancient Greek writers and myths associated several minor deities and figures with Libya. The goddess Lamia was described in classical myth as a Libyan queen, while Medusa and the Gorgons were frequently localized there. The Greeks also associated the god Triton with the Libyan landscape, identifying his home as Lake Tritonis, and the Hesperides were believed to be the daughters of Atlas, a figure Herodotus linked to the Atlas Mountains. The Atlas Mountains were actively worshipped as a sacred pillar and deity by the native western Libyans (Berbers), and late classical geography routinely associated the Canary Islands with the mythical realm of the Hesperides.

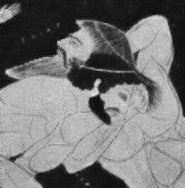
Antaeus is depicted with long hair and beard, contrary to Heracles.

The Greeks and the Libyans began to break their harmony in the period of Battus II of Cyrene (583-560 BC). Battus II began secretly to invite other Greek groups to Libya, Tunisia and East Algeria. The Libyans and Massyle considered that as a danger that had to be stopped. The Berbers began to fight against the Greeks, sometimes in alliance with the Egyptians and other times with the Carthaginians. Nevertheless, the Greeks were the victors. Some historians believe that the myth of Antaeus and Heracles was a reflection of those wars between the Libyans and Greeks.

Carthage began to ally with the Berber tribes after the Battle of Himera (480 BCE), in which the Carthaginians were defeated by the Greeks.

=== Roman-Berber beliefs ===
The Romans allied firstly with the Massyli against Carthage during the Second Punic War. The campaigns of their king Masinissa against Carthage led to the eventual destruction of Carthage in 146 BCE and the annexation of the remaining Punic realm as the Province of Africa by the Romans. But later, they also annexed Numidia to the Roman Empire in 25 BC and the neighboring kingdom of Mauretania in 44 AD.

Apuleius, a prominent Roman citizen philosopher and writer from the 2nd century of Numidian origins is famous for being the authority of several works documenting ancient Greek and Roman mythology, in fact, researchers argue that the tale of Cupid and Psyche, as written by the Apuleius, has its roots in berber oral tradition.

The Berber pantheon also contained multiple deities, known by the Romans as the Dii Mauri (lit. the Moorish gods), represented on reliefs and also the subject of dedications. During the Roman period, Saturn and Ops were the focus of an important cult, subsuming that of Baal Hammon and Tanit, two deities of Punic origin.

According to Pliny the Elder, the Libyans honored the war goddess Ifri, who was considered to be the protector of her worshipers (and seemed to have been an influential goddess in North Africa) and depicted her on the Berber coins. This goddess was represented in diverse ways on Numidian coins from the first century BCE. When the Romans conquered Northern Africa, she appeared in sculpture and on the coins of the Roman states in North Africa.

The Roman pantheon seems to have been adopted generally, although the cult of Saturn and Ops, as mentioned above, was perhaps the most important.

The Romans displayed great tolerance to the Berber religious cults, which explains the Berbers's receptiveness of the Roman civilisation. As such, after Christianity had become the official religion of the Roman Empire, North Africa was one of the most heavily Christianised areas. By the seventh century, most of North Africa's population in the urban centres and coastal plains had been Christian for a long time and paganism had vanished from prominence, except among the Berber tribes.

== Sources ==
- Bates, Oric (1914). The eastern Libyans. Macmillan Publishers.
- Brett, Michael; Fentress, Elizabeth (1996). The Berbers. Blackwell Publishing.
- Swei, Abdullaziz Saeed (July 2012). "Religion in Old Libya" (PDF). Veritas. 3 (3): 37–41.
