= Gurzil =

Ancient Berber deity

Gurzil was an ancient Berber deity. In the Latin poem Iohannis by the 6th-century poet Corippus, he is the son of Ammon and a cow. The poem mentions multiple representations of the god, including a depiction as a bull which was taken into battle. It has been suggested that Gurzil's name is related that of the settlement of Ghirza, from which archaeological remains include a temple and an inscription and relief pertaining to the sacrifice of cattle. In the 11th century AD, the Muslim writer al-Bakrī mentioned a sanctuary at a place named "Gherza", which may be the same as Ghirza.

Other finds which have been proposed as evidence for Gurzil include a statue and relief of a horned god, a temple in Gholaia dedicated to "Vanammon", and a Neo-Punic inscription from Leptis Magna. Some scholars have interpreted Gurzil as a bull god, a characterisation which others have opposed. Connections with other animals have also been suggested.

== Iohannis ==
Gurzil figures prominently in the Iohannis, a Latin poem composed by the poet Corippus in the mid-6th-century. According to the poem, the Laguatan of Tripolitania carried a representation of Gurzil in the form of a bull into battle against the Romans when they revolted along with the Austurii in AD 546. They regarded Gurzil as the offspring of Ammon, presumably the Ammon whose temple was at Siwa, and a cow. Corippus links the cults of Gurzil and Ammon, and in one place refers to "Ammonian Gurzil", elsewhere juxtaposing the two gods.

Representations of Gurzil are mentioned in several other places in the poem. Prior to the fighting, the Byzantine general John Troglita announces that he seeks to destroy a wooden "carved Gurvil". After several battles, the Laguatan and their allies were defeated. Ierna, the chief of the Laguatan and priest of Gurzil, was killed while trying to rescue the image of the god, which was destroyed. Other than Ierna, there is no attestation amongst the Berbers of an individual holding both royal and religious positions in this way.

== Ghirza ==
The name of Gurzil may be detected elsewhere in the toponymy of Tripolitania. Some scholars have suggested that it is related to the name of Ghirza, a settlement in Roman Libya. Archaeological evidence from the site may support this etymology, including an inscription which mentions the sacrifice of 51 cattle, and a relief which depicts the sacrifice of a bull. One of the buildings found at the site was a large temple, built in the Semitic style, which included twenty votive altars as well as bowls. David J. Mattingly considers it likely that Ghirza was Gurzil's cult centre, and he views the evidence featuring bulls as supporting this conclusion. (Note: Mattingly 2011, pp. 265, 267. On Gurzil's possible status as a bull god, see § Interpretation.)

According to the 11th-century Muslim writer al-Bakrī, there was a location called Gherza in Tripolitania with a hilltop sanctuary containing a stone idol that the Berber tribes from the surrounding region still worshipped. According to Yves Modéran, the location al-Bakrī mentions may be Ghirza, and the idol perhaps connected with Gurzil. (Note: Modéran 2003, p. 286. He writes that the identification of the places is "strongly suggest[ed]" by al-Bakrī's description and their similar names.)

== Other possible evidence ==
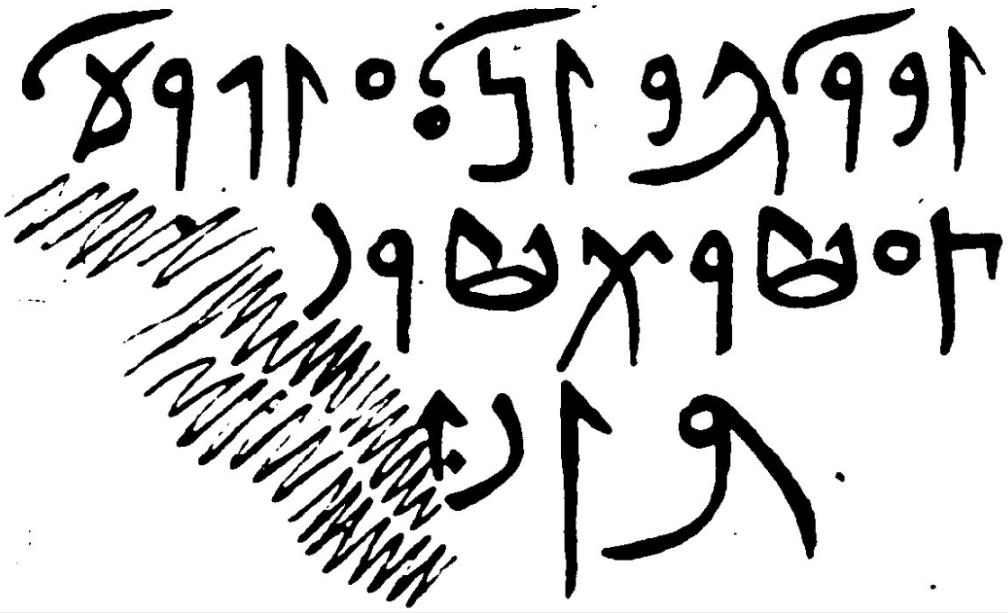
The Neo-Punic inscription which Abdulhafid F. Elmayer interpreted as naming Gurzil in the final four letters of its first line

A horned god depicted on a relief from Volubilis has been identified as Gurzil by Henri Morestin; this would be the only evidence of his worship outside Tripolitania, though Gabriel Camps characterises the identification as a "risky hypothesis". Marcel Bénabou interprets a statue from Iulia Valentia Banasa, depicting a horned god, as a representation of Gurzil, which Camps also disputes. (Note: Brouquier-Reddé 1992, p. 250 n. 3, citing Bénabou 1976, p. 300 and Camps 1980, p. 228.)

Gurzil's name may also be connected with a temple, located in the Roman fort of Gholaia (modern-day Bu Njem), dedicated to a figure named Vanammon; Rene Rebuffat propounds that Van- meant roughly 'son of' for the Berbers, thereby interpreting the temple's dedicatee as Gurzil. (Note: Merrills 2023, p. 242, citing Rebuffat 1990, pp. 140–141.) Andy Merrills raises doubts over this connection, writing that multiple other figures were considered sons of Ammon in the ancient world, including Alexander the Great.

In 1982, Abdulhafid F. Elmayer interpreted a Neo-Punic inscription from Leptis Magna as mentioning Gurzil, in the last four letters of its first line. The early-20th-century scholar Levi Delia Vida had read the second line's first four characters as spelling "Satur". Elmayer wrote that if this is a reference to the Roman god Saturn, it suggests he was identified with Gurzil (which would be the only known instance of identification of deities in Berber culture). Elmayer's theory that the inscription mentioned Gurzil has been repudiated by subsequent scholars.

== Interpretation ==
Bénabou describes Gurzil as a "bull-god", as does Véronique Brouquier-Reddé, who mentions that Corippus describes his mother as a cow. Peter Riedlberger argues against this conclusion, writing that Gurzil's link to cattle need not have extended beyond a general association. Modéran suggests that the bull may only have been part of rituals in his honour. According to Merrills, the presence of a pun on the word "ram" in one passage of Corippus's poem may suggest a link between Gurzil and his father's ram cult. Merrills also writes that Gurzil may have been associated with horses, pointing to a passage of the poem in which the god attempts to stop a horse "to which he had entrusted himself" from flattening one of his worshippers.
