= Austuriani =

The Austuriani or Austoriani were a Berber people who lived along the frontier of the Roman Empire in Africa. They appear as raiders and enemies in Roman sources between the fourth and sixth centuries.

== History ==
Austuriani first appear in the historical record in the years 363–365, when they devastated the Roman province of Tripolitania with "more violence than usual", according to Ammianus Marcellinus. These attacks were a response to the execution of the Austurian leader Stachao, who had been arrested by the Romans for spying. The regions around Lepcis and Oea were especially hard hit. The devastation mainly affected the countryside and involved the destruction of fields and orchards. A slightly earlier inscription from Lepcis referring to the "arrogance of the barbarians" may have the Austuriani in mind.

Their depredations lasted years. According to Philostorgius, the Auxourianoi lived between the Libyans and the Afri. Later in the century, they raided as far west as Africa Proconsularis and as far east as Egypt in league with the Mazices. The Austuriani may be behind the mysterious "Saturiani" against whom the praetorian prefect of Africa was ordered to take action by a constitutio dated 20 July 399.

An inscription at Lepcis made between 408 and 423 honours Flavius Ortygius, military commander of Tripolitania, for suppressing the "furor of the Austuriani", suggesting a particularly serious raid. The only other source for the raids of this period are the letters and sermons of Synesius of Cyrene. He mentions them in eighteen of his surviving letters and in his two sermons called Catastasis ('Downfall'). He records that the "Ausuriani" were a persistent threat to Cyrenaica between 404 and 411, ravaging the countryside, interfering with the port of Phycus and even besieging the cities. From 406 to 409, he organized a militia to repel them, during which time his own villa was ravaged. They gave men no quarter and enslaved women. During major fighting in 411, he reports that they used camels and expresses concern that they would invade Egypt. In one letter, he praises the general Anysius for a victory he achieved over one thousand Ausuriani that year in a tight defile with a unit of just forty Unnigardae. In both letters and sermons, Synesius appeals for more troops. He asks Anysius to procure more Unnigardae. His Catastasis has been interpreted as an indirect appeal to the praetorian prefect Anthemius for reinforcements.

The "Ausoriani" were still raiding Cyrenaica shortly before 449, as recorded by Priscus.

In the sixth-century epic Iohannis, the poet Corippus mentions a camel-riding people called the Austur who lived near the Syrtes during the time of John Troglita's campaigns (546–547). They were probably a remnant of the Austuriani. Their leader is Ierna, a priest of Gurzil and rex Marmaridum (king of the Marmarides). Corippus describes their fighting tactics thus:

The warlike Austur, wary of joining an uncertain battle in the open field, creates walls and ditches by tying camels together, and places his mixed flock in a tight protective crown, so that he can entangle the attacking enemies and crush them when they get lost. Then, springing forward, the savage Ilaguas kills the troops that are trapped in these ramparts, and safely takes possession of the field … They use the ram as a machine in their unspeakable wars and set up their tents in good order, having arranged their standards.

== Identity ==
The Austuriani are sometimes regarded as a tribe, but were more probably a tribal confederacy, a latent alliance that could be "activated" in time of need.

The relationship between the Austuriani and the Laguatan is a matter of debate. David Mattingly argues that they are the same tribal confederacy under different names at different periods. The Austur were originally just the dominant tribe of the confederacy. Yves Modéran rejects this thesis, pointing out that Corippus places the Austur and Ilaguas side by side as distinct contemporaries.

The sudden appearance of the Austuriani in the written sources corresponds with changes in settlement patterns detectable in the archaeology of Tripolitania, "where open farms had disappeared almost entirely by the fourth century". These changes, including increased tension and violence between city and country, have been linked to migrations. On this theory, they were "neo-Berbers", new tribal formations produced by the migration of eastern tribes from Egypt and Cyrenaica westward. More often today, the Austuriani are recognized as the product of local social transformation, given the association of the name with the same space over two centuries.

== Bibliography ==
- Bregman, Jay (1982). Synesius of Cyrene: Philosopher-Bishop. University of California Press. doi:10.1525/9780520378643. ISBN 978-0-520-37864-3.
- Desanges, Jehan (1990). "Austoriani / Austur". Encyclopédie berbère. Vol. 8. p. 1169. doi:10.4000/encyclopedieberbere.149.
- Felici, Fabrizio; Munzi, Massimiliano; Tantillo, Ignazio (2006). "Austuriani e Laguatan in Tripolitania" (PDF). L'Africa Romana. 16 (1): 591–688.
- Fitzgerald, Augustine, ed. (1926). The Letters of Synesius of Cyrene. Oxford University Press.
- Liebeschuetz, J. H. W. G. (1986). "Why Did Synesius Become Bishop of Ptolemais?". Byzantion. 56: 180–195. JSTOR 44160991.
- Mattingly, D. J. (1983). "The Laguatan: A Libyan Tribal Confederation in the Late Roman Empire". Libyan Studies. 14: 96–108. doi:10.1017/S0263718900007810.
- Merrills, Andy (2023). War, Rebellion and Epic in Byzantine North Africa: A Historical Study of Corippus' Iohannis. Cambridge University Press.
- Modéran, Yves (2003). "De Julius Honorius à Corippus: la réapparition des Maures au Maghreb oriental". Comptes rendus des séances de l'Académie des Inscriptions et Belles-Lettres. 147 (1): 257–285.
- Reynolds, J. M. (1977). "The Austuriani and Tripolitania in the Early Fifth Century". Libyan Studies. 8: 13. doi:10.1017/S026371890000073X.
