= Nanna Tala =

- Divinity of Water
- Other names: Nanna Thala, Lalla Tala, Lalla Thala
- Venerated in: Numidia; Libya
- Major cult centre: Nafusa; Cyrene, Libya
- Adherents: Berbers
- Tree: Palm Tree
- Gender: Female

Genealogy
- Died: Jado, Nafusa.

Nanna Tala is a mythic female figure in numitheism and a sacred ancestral spirit associated with a natural spring in Libya's Nafusa Mountains, a site long regarded as spiritually potent, especially for healing and traditional feminine practices.

== Name ==
Nanna Tala — proper noun appearing in Berber cultural contexts mainly in Numidia and Libya. The name combines “nanna” (Berber lexical form for an elder woman/grandmother) and tala or thala (“spring, source of water” in Berber languages) suggesting “grandmother of the spring” or “sacred spring lady".

== In mythology ==
Nanna Tala was a mythic woman from Uqatres who quarreled with her family. Departing, she took with her a jar of water and a few dates, her distaff, and her two children. She eventually came to a mound and stopped there with her children to a place in the throat of a ravine, where she is now buried. Every day, she gave them dates to eat and water from the jar to drink, and they went to sleep. In the morning, they found the dates, and the jar full of water, just as before.

Nanna Tala began to spin with her distaff then she dropped it from on top of the mound, down into the ravine, and a water spring burst forth where the staff fell. Her relatives searched for her and found her on this mound. They begged her to come back with them. She said, “This is my country, and I will abide here. But I shall die. When I am dead, bury me here on this mound, together with my children, one on each side of me.”. In that very moment, she died suddenly, and her children died also. They buried her on that mound and built above her a great place of worship at the very spot where her distaff fell, and they dug a large pit that became full of water and that never dries any time of year.

People make pilgrimages to her, because she is considered a holy woman. They bring her offerings, slaughter goats and bullocks, and all those who come Nana Tala's spring eat of this meat, dividing the meat into equal shares for every person. If the person who assigns the portions makes any mistake diving the portions, the pit of water becomes red as blood, and when the color of the water changes, that is how the pilgrims know that there has been some mistake and they investigate the matter. When they have discover the mistake, the pit returns to its former condition, and when the mistake has been set right, the water again becomes clear white, as it was before.

== History ==
European linguistic and ethnographic collections (e.g., Buselli and Provasi fieldwork) have recorded texts and stories involving Nanna Tala as a recurring motif in Berber folklore from the region of Jadu and Jemmari.

== Location ==
The town of Jado, or Fess’at’u as it is known to its Berber natives, is one of the main Berber settlements in the Western Mountain. Places of interest include the spring of Nanna Tala at the base of the valley, The sacred spring of Nanna Tala rests 15 km south-west of Arhibat, Nafusa Mountain.

In regional oral tradition, women and children historically visited the site seeking curative water, especially for illness or during specific life events
