= Africa (goddess) =

Roman goddess and personification of the continent Africa

- Goddess of Fertility and Fortune
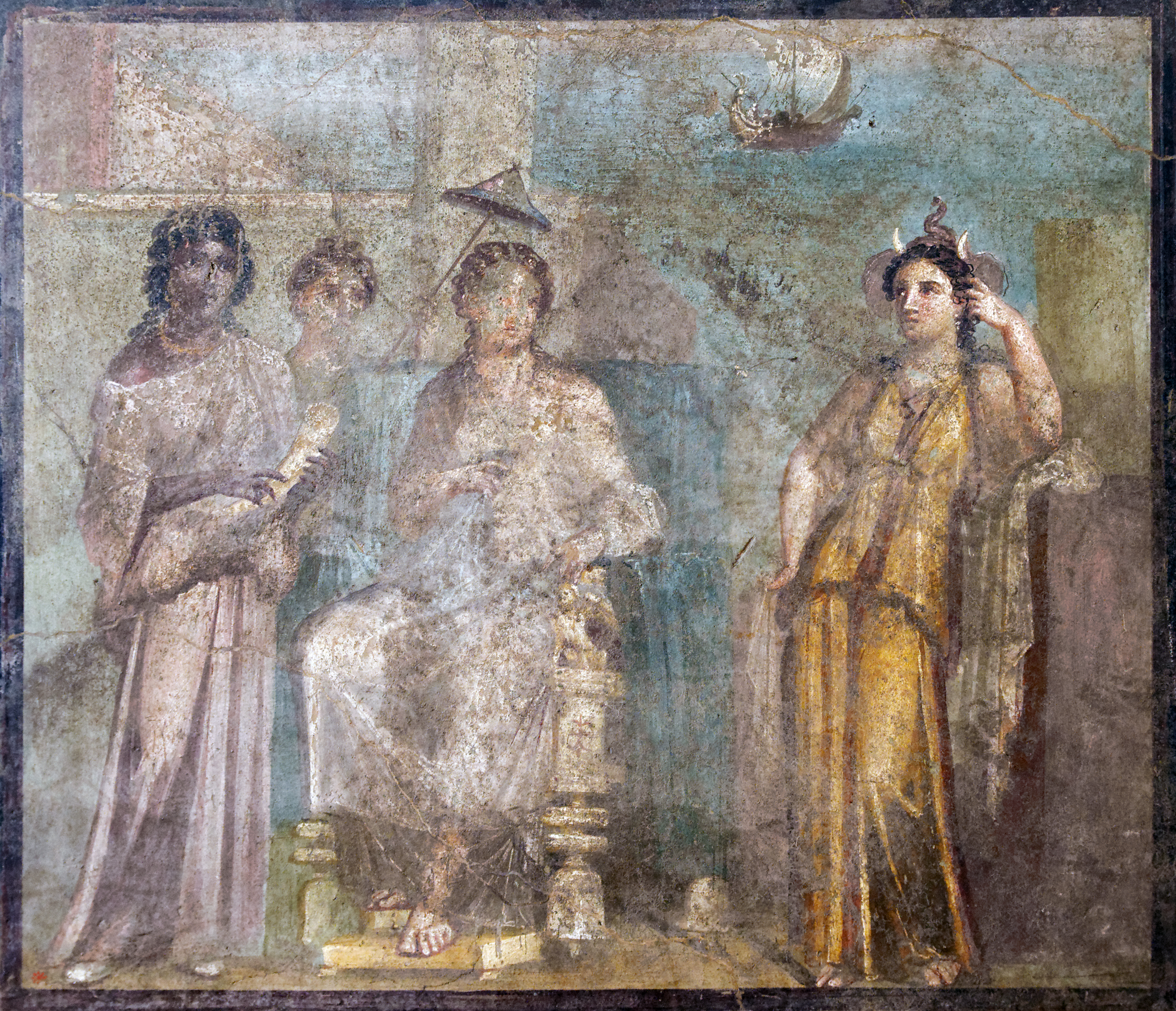
- Africa (right) with Queen Dido (centre), and an 'Aethiopian' woman presenting ivory (left), Roman fresco from Pompeii, before 79 CE
- Other names: Ifri, Ifru, Dea Patria (goddess of the homeland)
- Venerated in: Africa Preconsularis, Numidia
- Affiliation: Numitheism, Roman Pantheon
- Major cult centre: Thimugadi, Algeria
- Abode: North Africa, Caves
- Gender: Female
- Temple: Sanctuary of Thimugadi, Algeria; El Djem (Thysdrus), Tunisia

Genealogy
- Offspring: Four Seasons

In numitheism and ancient Roman religion, Africa (Latin: Dea Africa) (Tamazight: Ifri/Ifru) was a goddess of fertility and abundance worshipped by the Berbers and the tribe of Ifri. Her iconography typically included an elephant-mask headdress, a cornucopia, a military standard, and a lion.

To the Romans she was considered a minor deity, "Africa" was their imperial province, roughly equating to modern north-east Algeria, Tunisia and coastal Libya and so to them she eventually became the personification of Africa in the early centuries of the common era. The goddess was not given sub-Saharan African characteristics because she was thought of as Berber.

After her image was revived in the Renaissance, she was reduced to a personification of Africa with no divine pretensions, one of the popular team of personifications of the Four Continents.

== Etymology ==
Afri was a Latin name used to refer to the inhabitants of what was then known as North Africa, located west of the Nile river, and in its widest sense referring to all lands south of the Mediterranean, also known as Ancient Libya. This name "Africa" seems to have originally referred to a native Libyan tribe, the ancestors of the modern Berbers, the Latin designation (Africa) originally meant the land of the Afri was also known from the Berber word ifri (plural ifran) meaning "cave".

The same word may have been found in the name of the Banu Ifran from Algeria and Tripolitania, a Berber tribe originally from Yafran (also known as Ifrane) in northwestern Libya.

== Function and worship ==
To the Berbers, Africa was a deity associated with caves which were her main places of worship, coins and other materials depicting this deity were discovered mainly in Algeria in Albulae (Aïn Temouchent) and in Guechguech, 16 km east of Constantine.

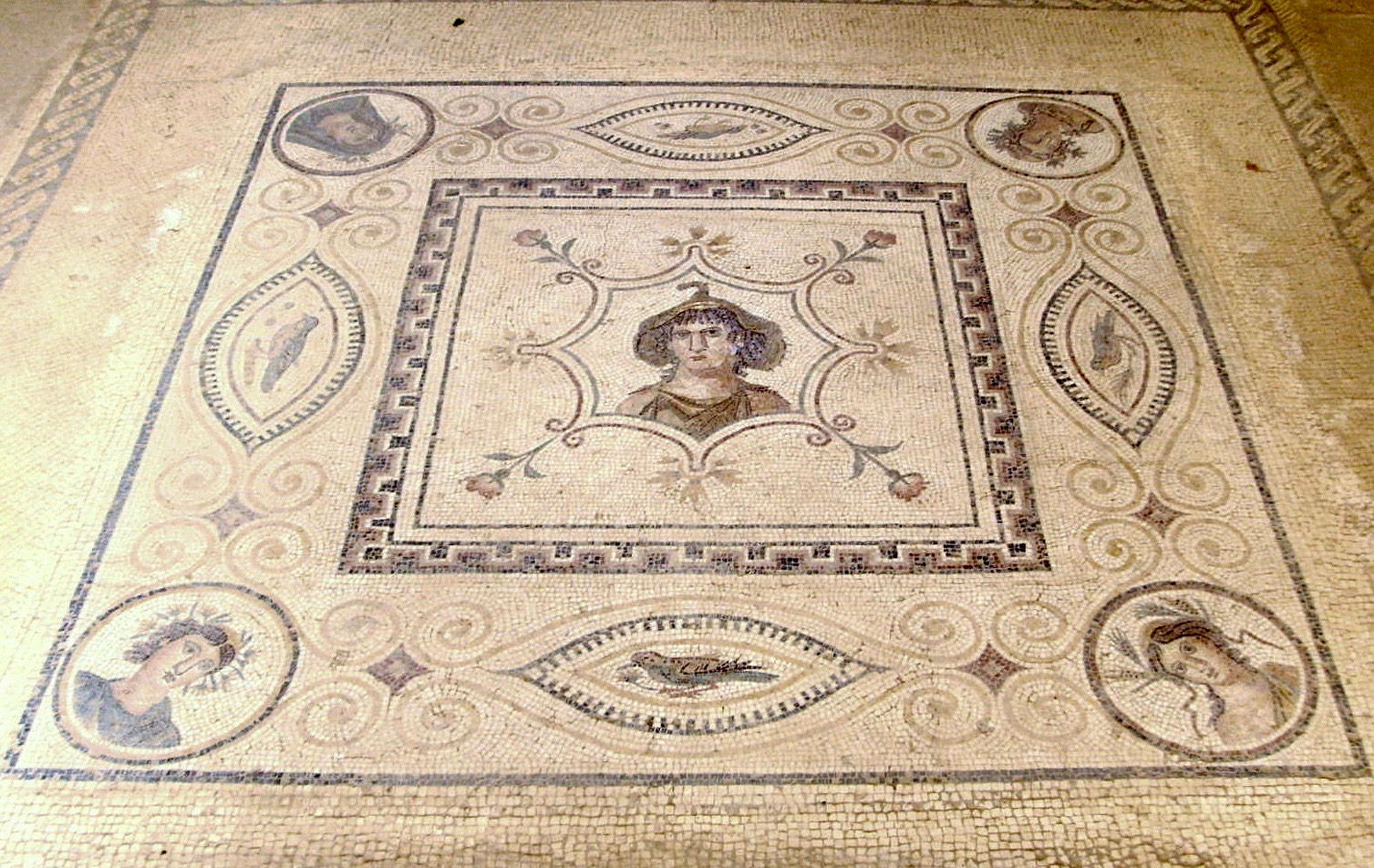
A 2nd-century CE Tunisian mosaic of Goddess Africa with the Four Seasons.

To the Romans, the distinction between worshipped goddesses and personified figures that served iconographic functions was elastic, with Africa appearing to have functioned in both roles. In his Natural History, Pliny the Elder wrote: "in Africa nemo destinat aliquid nisi praefatus Africam", which scholars translate as "no one in Africa does anything without first calling on Africa". This has been used as proof of her importance, in some cases interpreted as a proof for a North African goddess-centric cult. Other writers have also interpreted the female personification of Africa to be a goddess (Dea), although she would have undoubtedly been a minor deity.

Africa was one of a number of "province personifications," which included Britannia, Hispania, Macedonia, and a number of Greek-speaking provinces. Africa was one of the earliest to appear, and may have originated with the publicity around Pompey the Great's African triumph in 80 BC; coins with both Pompey and Africa shown have been discovered.

== Archeology ==
Historians who studied ancient Africa have long recognized a deity bearing the name of Ifru. It was depicted above a rock in Guechguech, 16 km east of Constantine, between El Massine and Oullaza in Algeria. French historian and archeologist Stephen Gsell considered that the name of Ifru could place this deity among the mountain genii or troglodyte deities.

Some scholars have questioned whether the personified Africa was ever considered a goddess by the Romans or North Africans. Neither Pliny nor any writer thereafter ever described her as Dea, nor is there an epigraphical inscription containing Dea Africa. In contrast, other Roman goddesses carry the prefix Dea in texts and inscriptions. Since Romans already had their own goddesses of fertility and abundance, there was potentially no need for a competing goddess in the same role.

== Iconography ==
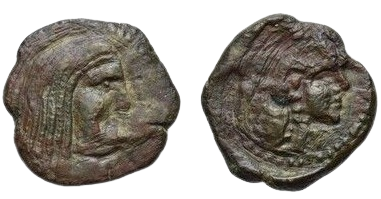
On the left, the bust of Hierbas, on the right, the head of Africa, wearing an elephant skin headdress

Several variations of numidian coins from different kings of Numidia which bore the symbol of the goddess Africa (Ifri) wearing the elephant skin headdress were uncovered in Numidia.

Africa was also portrayed on coins, carved stones, and mosaics in Roman Africa. In Timgad, she was the main goddess of the great sanctuary of the Aqua Septimiana Felix, where she was worshipped as Dea Patria (goddess of the homeland). A sanctuary found in Timgad (Thamugadi in Berber) in Algeria features goddess Africa's iconography.

On coins reminiscent of a visit by Hadrian (in 122 or 128 AD), the Mauretanian geographical area was symbolised by the young woman Africa dressed in a short tunic with various attributes. On some she wore a cornucopia, on others ears of corn; it could be topped with the remains of an elephant's head which underlined its African affiliation. On one of the types, she carried a vexillum (military standard).

The elephant headdress is seen first on coins depicting Alexander the Great, commemorating his invasion of India, including the (possibly fake) "Porus medallions" issued during his lifetime and the coinage of Ptolemy I of Egypt issued from 319 to 294 BC. It may have had resonances with Pharaonic ideology. The image was later adopted on coinage of Agathocles of Syracuse minted around 304 BC, following his African Expedition. Subsequently it is seen on coinage of King Ibaras of Numidia, a kingdom that Pompey defeated in 1st century BCE, so very likely picked up from there by Pompey's image-makers.

== Renaissance revival ==
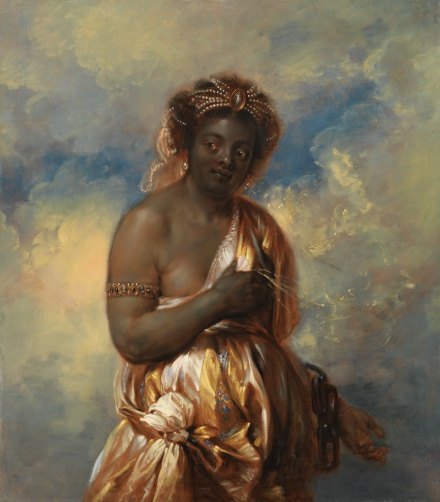
Allegory of Africa, 17th century oil painting by Jan Boeckhorst

During the Renaissance, the personification of Africa was revived; by the 17th century, she was usually depicted with a dark complexion, curly hair, and a broad nose, in addition to her Roman attributes. She was a necessary part of images of the Four Continents, which were popular in several media.

== Gallery ==
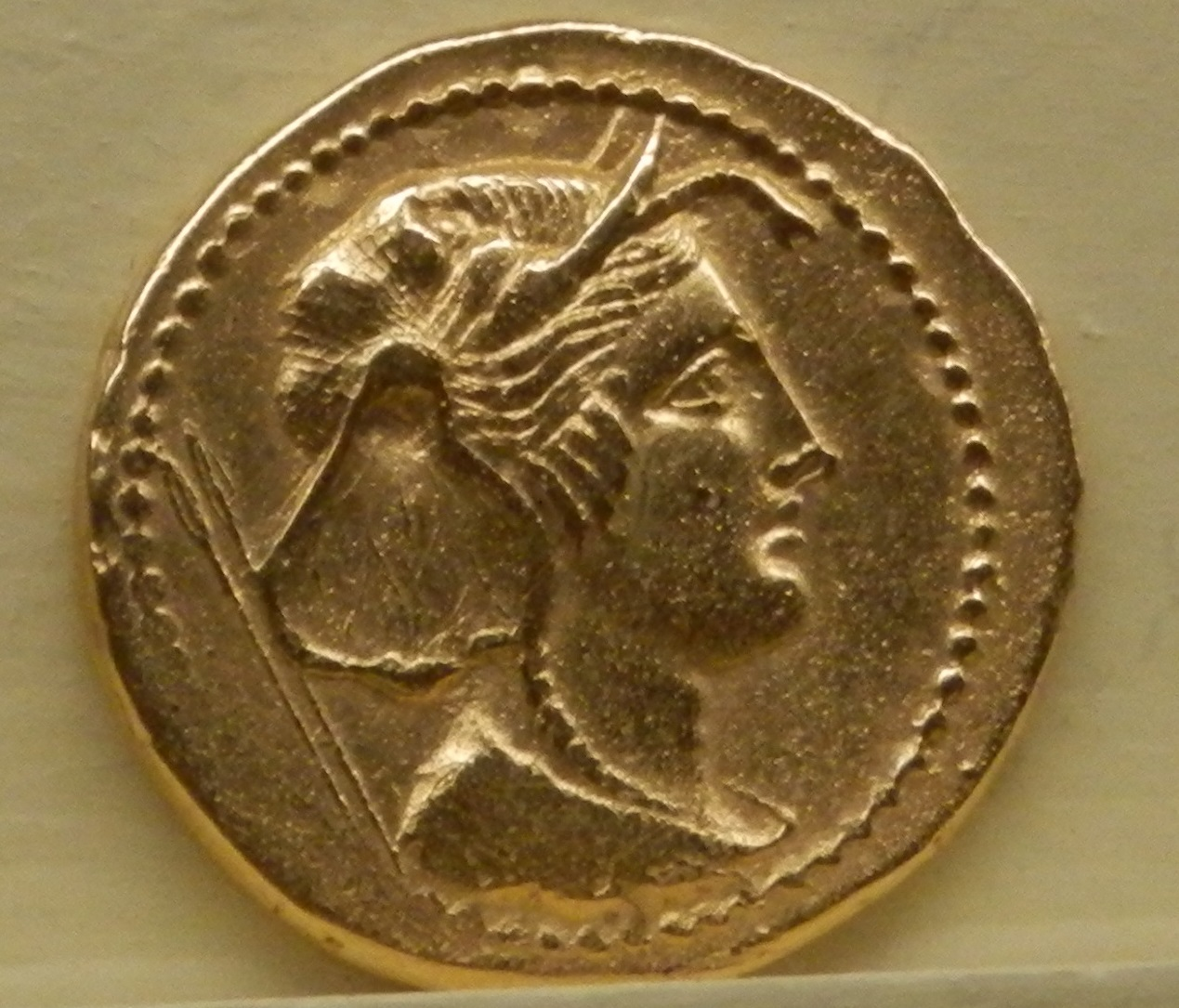
Aureus by Quintus Cornificius, 43 BC : goddess Africa.

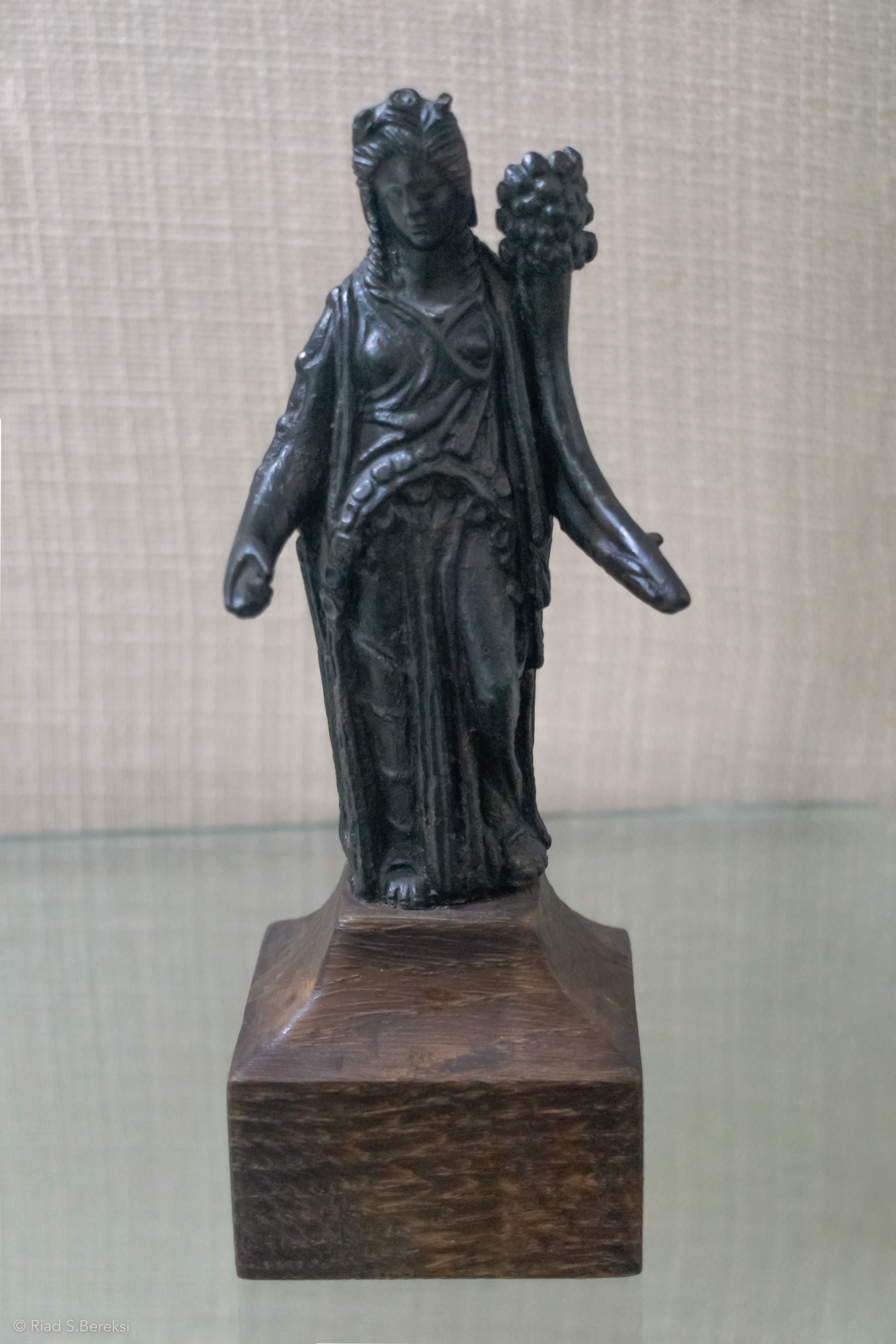
Statuette of the goddess Africa.

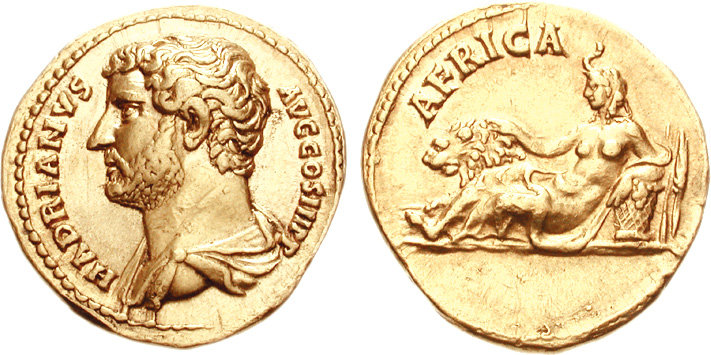
Coin from the time of Hadrian, with an image of the goddess Africa

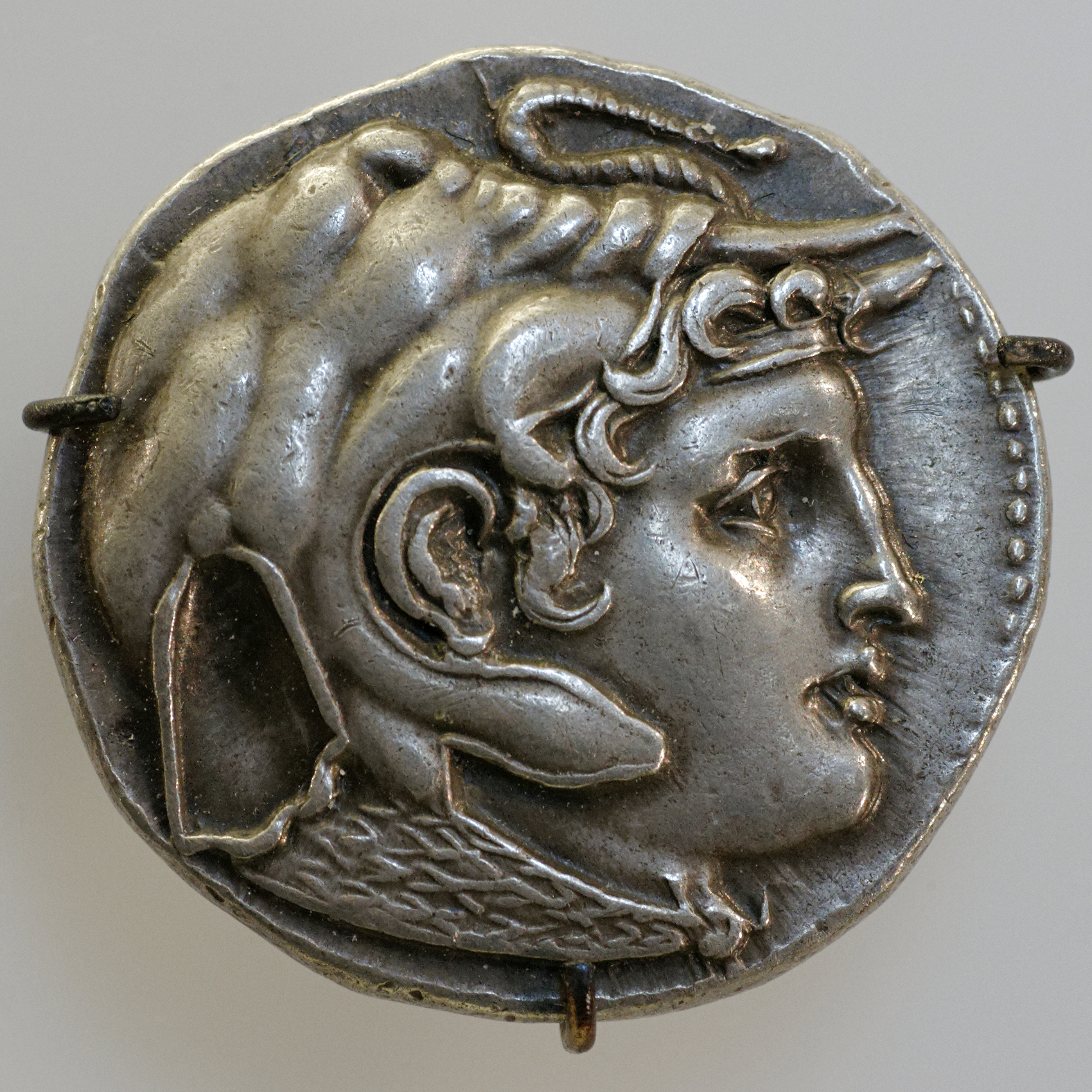
Tetradrachm of Ptolemy I depicting Alexander the Great with an elephant scalp headdress

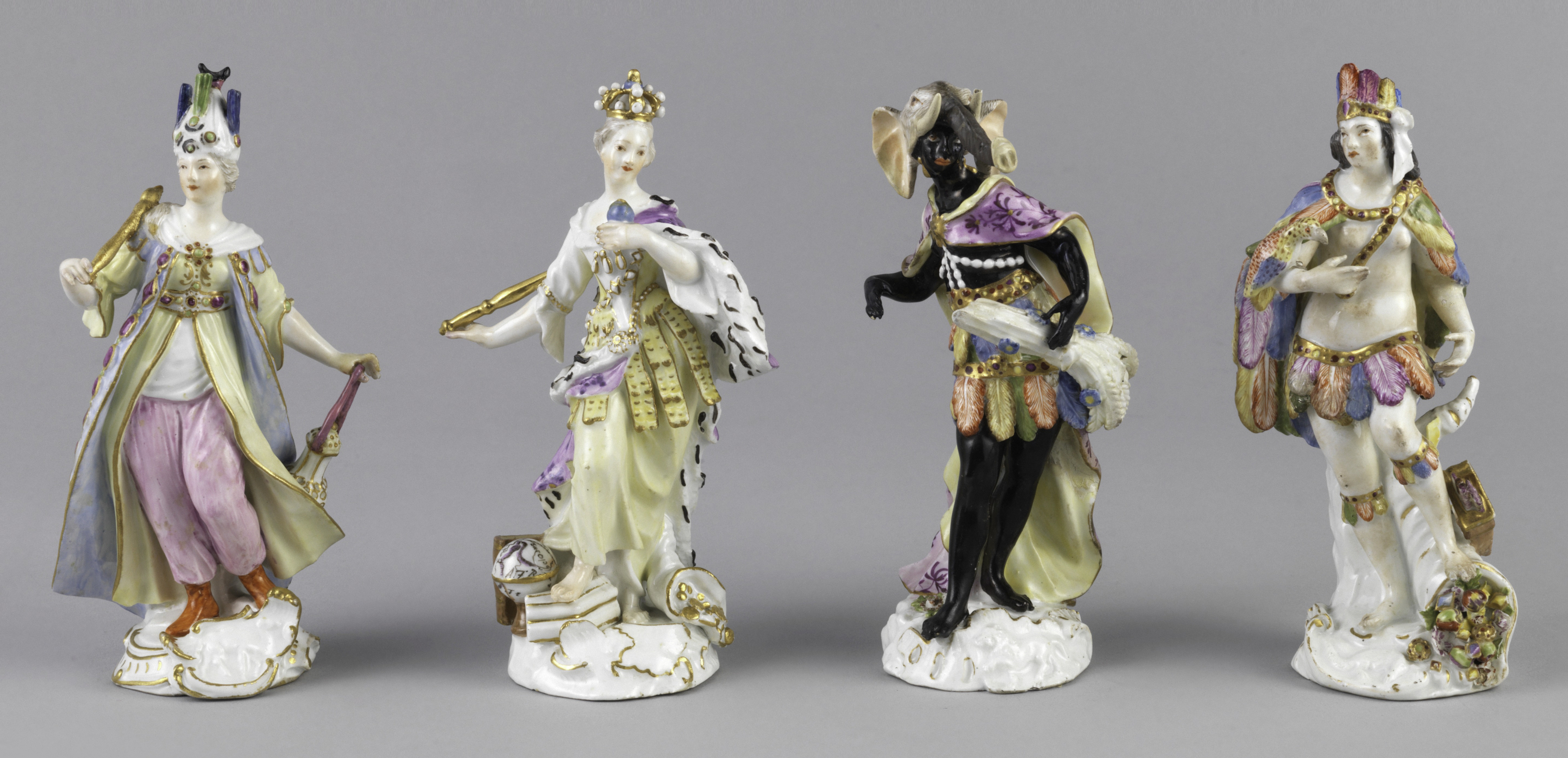
Set of porcelain figures, German, c. 1775, from left: Asia, Europe, Africa, America.

== See also ==
- Bona Dea
- Ceres (mythology)
- Leticia
- Libera (mythology)
- Ops
- Terra (mythology)
- Vestal Virgin
