= Sinifere =

Amazigh god of war

- War
- Other names: Canapphari or Mars
- Latin: deo marti canapphari avgvsto
- Venerated in: Libya
- Major cult centre: Bu Njem. Tripolitania
- Adherents: Ancient Libyans

Equivalents
- Greek: Ares
- Roman: Mars

Sinifere, also known as Canapphari, was an Libyan god of Warwho had a major cult center and a temple in Bu Njem, Tripolitania.

== History ==
A dedication of the temple erected by a detachment of the 3rd Legion in 225 AD which was garrisoned at Golas under the command of the centurion T. Flavius Apronianus reads the following :

"deo marti canapphari avgvsto..."

Canapphari (or Canappharis) is an indigenous Libya deity equated with the Roman Mars. Not Numidian He therefore has the same characteristics as Sinifere, god of war, mentioned in these same regions three centuries later by Corripus. It is probable that Sinifere and Canapphari are the same name, laboriously transcribed at different times.
