= Yves Modéran =

French historian

Yves Modéran (1955 – 1 July 2010, Paris) was a French historian, a professor of Roman history at the University of Caen Normandy.

Agrégé d'histoire in 1978, he was a specialist of North Africa during Antiquity and later, in particular of the Vandals period. He took part to the excavations at Bulla Regia as part of studies organized by the École française de Rome.

== Works (partial list) ==
- 1987: "Qui montana Gurubi colunt". Corrippe et le mythe des Maures du cap Bon, MEFRA, volume 99, n°99-2, (pp. 963-989) Read online
- 1989: Gildon, les Maures et l'Afrique romaine, MEFRA, volume 101, n°101-2, (pp. 821-872) Read online
- 1993: La chronologie de la Vie de saint Fulgence de Ruspe et ses incidences sur l'histoire de l'Afrique vandale, MEFRA, volume 105, n°105-1, (pp. 135-188) Read online
- 2003: Les Maures et l'Afrique romaine, IVe–VIIe., ed. Bibliothèque des Ecoles françaises d'Athènes et de Rome
- 2003: L'Empire romain tardif (235-395), éd. Ellipses Marketing, Paris, ISBN 2729811583
- 2014: Les Vandales et l'Empire romain, (with Michel-Yves Perrin) éd. Errance - Actes Sud, ISBN 2877724352
