= Roman military frontiers and fortifications =

Part of a grand strategy of territorial defense in the Roman Empire

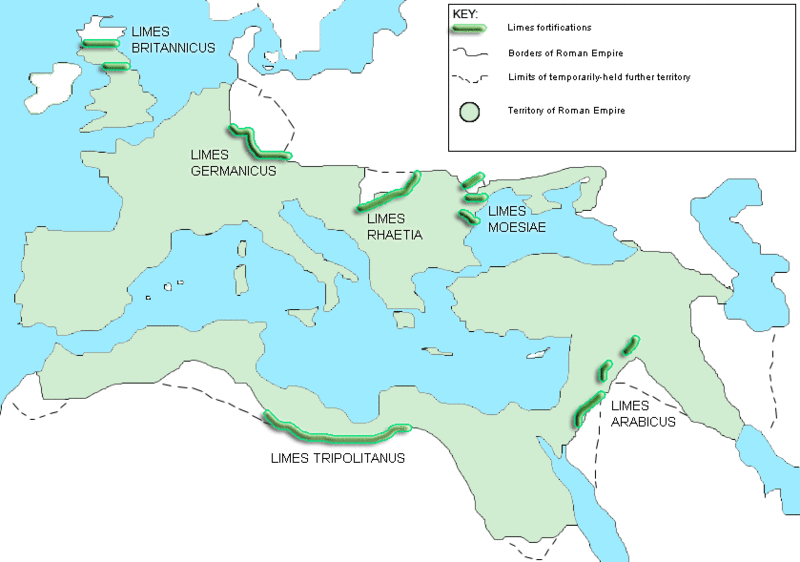
Map of all the territories once occupied by the Roman Empire, along with locations of limes

Roman military borders and fortifications were part of a grand strategy of territorial defense in the Roman Empire, although this is a matter of debate. By the early 2nd century, the Roman Empire had reached the peak of its territorial expansion and rather than constantly expanding their borders as earlier in the Empire and Republic, the Romans solidified their position by fortifying their strategic position with a series of fortifications and established lines of defense. Historian Adrian Goldsworthy argues that the Romans had reached the natural limits which their military traditions afforded them conquest over and that beyond the borders of the early-to-mid Empire lay peoples whose military traditions made them militarily unconquerable, despite many Roman battle victories. In particular, Goldsworthy argues that the cavalry-based warfare of the Parthians, Sarmatians and Persians presented a major challenge to the expansion of Rome's infantry-based armies.

== Nature of the fortifications ==
The borders of the Roman Empire, which fluctuated throughout the empire's history, were a combination of natural frontiers (the Rhine and Danube rivers to the north and east, the Atlantic to the west, and deserts to the south) and man-made fortifications which separated the lands of the empire from the "barbarian" lands beyond.

Individual fortifications had been constructed by the Roman military from as early as the building of Rome's first city walls in the 6th or 7th century BC. However, systematic construction of fortifications around the periphery of the empire on a strategic scale began around 40 AD under Emperor Caligula. However, it was under Hadrian's rule, which began in 117, that the Roman frontier was systematically fortified. He spent half of his 21-year reign touring the empire and advocating for the construction of forts, towers, and walls all across the edges of the empire. The coherent construction of these fortifications on a strategic scale (i.e. to protect the empire as a whole rather than fortifying individual settlements) are sometimes known as the limes, and continued until around 270.

The frontiers often consisted of forts for auxiliaries, vexillations (e.g. Segedunum) or legions as well as a system of roads for the rapid transit of troops and, in some places, extensive walls. Perhaps the most famous example of the latter is Hadrian's Wall in Great Britain, which was built across the entire width of the island to protect from attack from tribes located in modern-day Scotland. The so-called Limes Britannicus is perhaps the best example, like the Great Wall of China, of an attempt to construct a continuous man-made fortification along the length of an entire border, a massive undertaking. However, it is not correct to interpret other frontiers in the same way or to view them as an impenetrable barrier.

Other frontiers would not have had a continuous man-made fortification for the entirety of their length. A river, desert, or natural outcropping of rock could provide the same effect for zero outlay. Fortifications such as Hadrian's Wall were not unbreachable: with milecastles some distance apart and patrols infrequent, small enemy forces would have been able to easily penetrate the defenses for small-scale raiding. However, a raiding party would be forced to fight its way through one of the well-defended gates and abandon any loot, thus negating the whole purpose of the raid.

Additionally, a large army would have been able to force a crossing of the frontier using siege equipment. The value of the frontier lay not in its absolute impenetrability but, as S. Thomas Parker argues, in its hindrance to the enemy: granting a delay or warning that could be used to summon concentrated Roman forces to the site. The frontiers are therefore perhaps better seen as an instrument allowing a greater economy of force in defense of a border than otherwise would be necessary to provide the same level of defense.

After 270, the maintenance of an impenetrable solid frontier was abandoned by Constantine I in favour of a policy, whether deliberate or forced by circumstance, of "defense in depth". This called for the maintenance of a softer, deeper perimeter area of defense, with concentrated hard points throughout its depth. The idea was that any invading force of a sufficient size could penetrate the initial perimeter but in doing so with any element of surprise or rapid movement would be forced to leave several defended hard points (fortresses) to its rear, hampering its lines of supply and communications, and threatening surrounding of the force.

In the very late Empire the frontiers became even more elastic, with little effort expended in maintaining frontier defense. Instead, armies were concentrated near the heart of the empire, and enemies allowed to penetrate in cases as far inwards as the Italian peninsula before being met in battle.

== Northern borders ==
=== Britannia ===
After conquering much of the modern landmass of Great Britain, the Romans halted their northern expansion at the southern fringe of Caledonia, what is now central Scotland. This left them with a border shared with a people who made repeated raids and insurrections against them. Unlike other borders throughout the empire, there was no natural border to fall back on such as desert or wide river that crossed the whole peninsula, so instead a series of defenses were built in southern to mid-Scotland in order to protect the province of Britannia from the Caledonians and later the Picts.

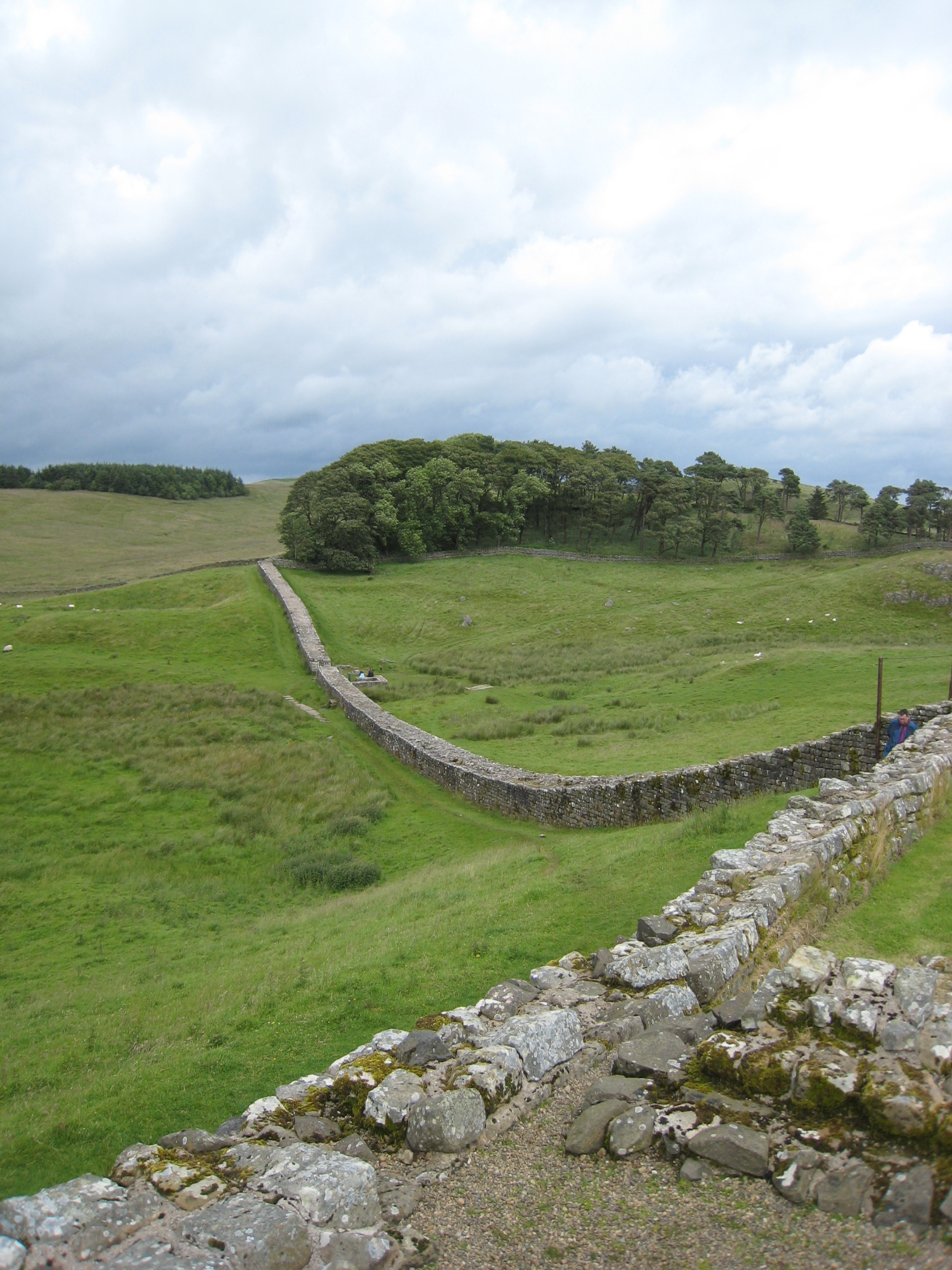
Hadrian's Wall viewed from Vercovicium

Although the border was not a continuous wall, a series of fortifications known as Gask Ridge in mid-Scotland may well be Rome's earliest fortified land frontier. Constructed in 70 or 80, it was superseded by the later Hadrian's Wall forty years later and then the final Antonine Wall twenty years after that. Rather than representing a series of consecutive advancements, the border should be seen as fluctuating - the Antonine Wall for example was built between 142 and 144, abandoned by 164 and briefly re-occupied in 208.

Although records are scarce, there are indications that the border fluctuated between the various fortifications depending on the local strength of the military. There is archaeological evidence for widespread burning of fortifications, but it is disputed whether this represents fortifications falling to attack or part of the normal process of the Roman military to destroy their own fortified camps on abandonment so as not to furnish the enemy with a fortified base at their expense.

These northern fortifications are sometimes styled the Limes Britannicus. The average garrison of the wall fortifications is thought to have been around 10,000 men. Along with a continuous wall (except in the case of Gask Ridge), there existed a metaled road immediately behind the wall for transport of troops. Along the wall there existed a few large forts for legions or vexillations, as well as a series of milecastles - effectively watchtowers that were unable to defend a stretch of wall against anything but low-scale raiding but were able to signal attack to legionary forts by means of fire signals atop the towers.

In the later Empire, Roman Britannia found itself increasingly vulnerable to external aggression, in parallel to attacks felt across the length of the Empire's borders. However, since Britannia shared no land bridge with continental Europe, the method of attack and thus methods of defense varied from the imperial standard. A series of naval forts was built along the south east coast, initially to combat piracy but later to protect from raiding and the threat of invasion from Saxons that eventually led to the Saxon occupation of Lowland Britain by 600 and is reflected in the name of the fortification system: the Saxon Shore, which extended to the northern coasts of France. Each shore fort both protected against direct attack and also sheltered a small naval sub-fleet of vessels that could patrol the coast against pirates and raiders.

=== Continental Europe ===
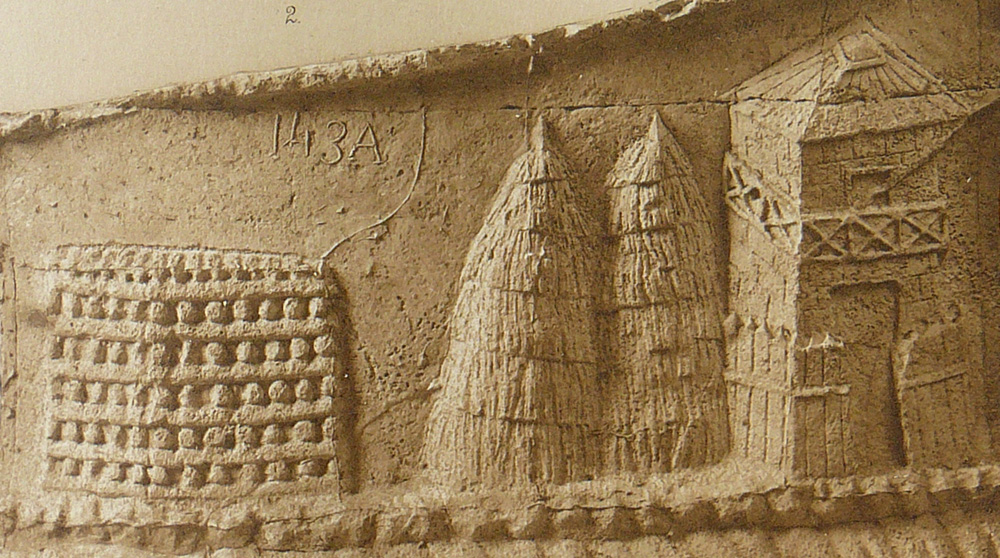
Roman watchtower and beacon on the lower Danube frontier

In continental Europe, the borders were generally well defined, usually following the courses of major rivers such as the Rhine and the Danube. Nevertheless, those were not always the final border lines: the original province of Dacia, in modern Romania, was completely north of the Danube, and the province of Germania Magna, which should not be confused with Germania Inferior and Germania Superior, was the land between the Rhine, the Danube and the Elbe (Although this province was lost three years after its creation as a result of the Battle of Teutoburg Forest). The limes that ran across the line of the Rhine-Danube was known as the Limes Germanicus.

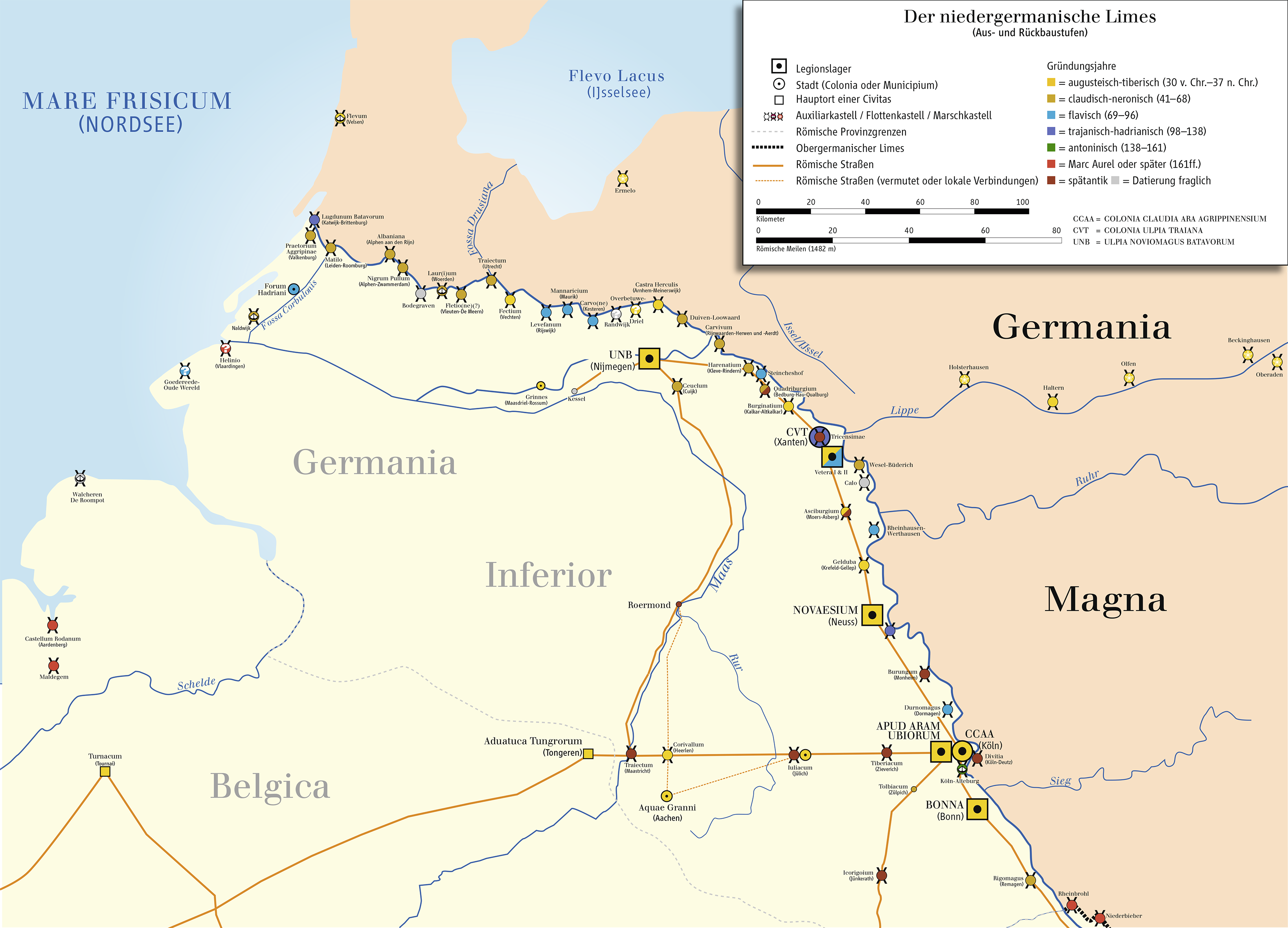
Lower Germanic Limes showing fortifications

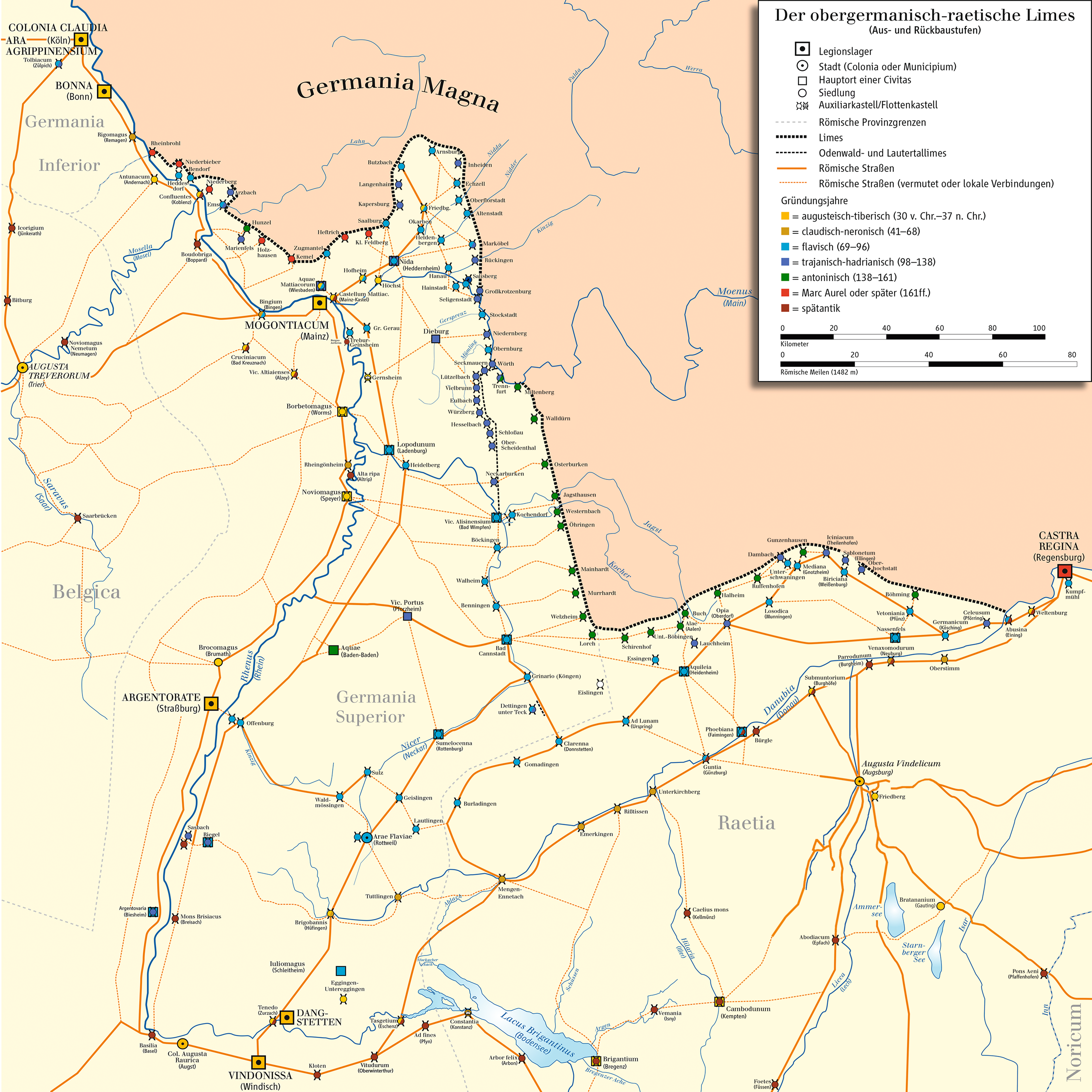
Upper Germanic & Raetian Limes showing forts

It consisted of:

- The Lower (Northern) Germanic Limes, which extended from the North Sea at Katwijk in the Netherlands along the Rhine;
- The Upper Germanic Limes (just to be confusing, also called the Rhaetian Limes or simply "the Limes") started from the Rhine at Rheinbrohl (Neuwied (district)) across the Taunus mountains to the river Main (East of Hanau), then along the Main to Miltenberg, and from Osterburken (Neckar-Odenwald-Kreis) south to Lorch (Ostalbkreis) in a nearly perfect straight line of more than 70 km;
- The proper Rhaetian Limes extended east from Lorch to Eining (close to Kelheim) on the Danube. The total length was 568 km (353 mi). It included at least 60 castles and 900 watchtowers.

In Dacia, the limes between the Black Sea and the Danube were a mix of the camps and the wall defenses: the Limes Moesiae was the conjunction of two, and sometimes three, lines of vallum, with a Great Camp and many minor camps spread through the fortifications.

== Eastern borders ==
The eastern borders changed many times, of which the most enduring was the Euphrates river, bordering the Parthian Empire in modern Iran and western Iraq. Rome advanced beyond the Euphrates for a time upon defeating their rivals, the Parthians in 116 AD, when Trajan captured Ctesiphon, and established new provinces in Assyria and Babylonia. Later that year he took the Parthian capital, Susa, and deposed the Parthian King Osroes I. However, the Romans did not Romanize the entire Parthian Empire, leaving Parthamaspates as a puppet king on the throne to rule over former Parthian lands with the exclusion of modern Iraq, which became Assyria and Mesopotamia.

== Southern borders ==
At the empire's greatest extent, the southern borders were the deserts of Arabia and the Sahara, that represented a natural barrier to prevent expansion. The Empire controlled the Mediterranean shores and the mountains opposite. However the Romans attempted twice to occupy effectively the Siwa Oasis (and failed) and controlled the Nile many kilometres into Africa until the 1st Cataract near the modern border between Egypt and Sudan.

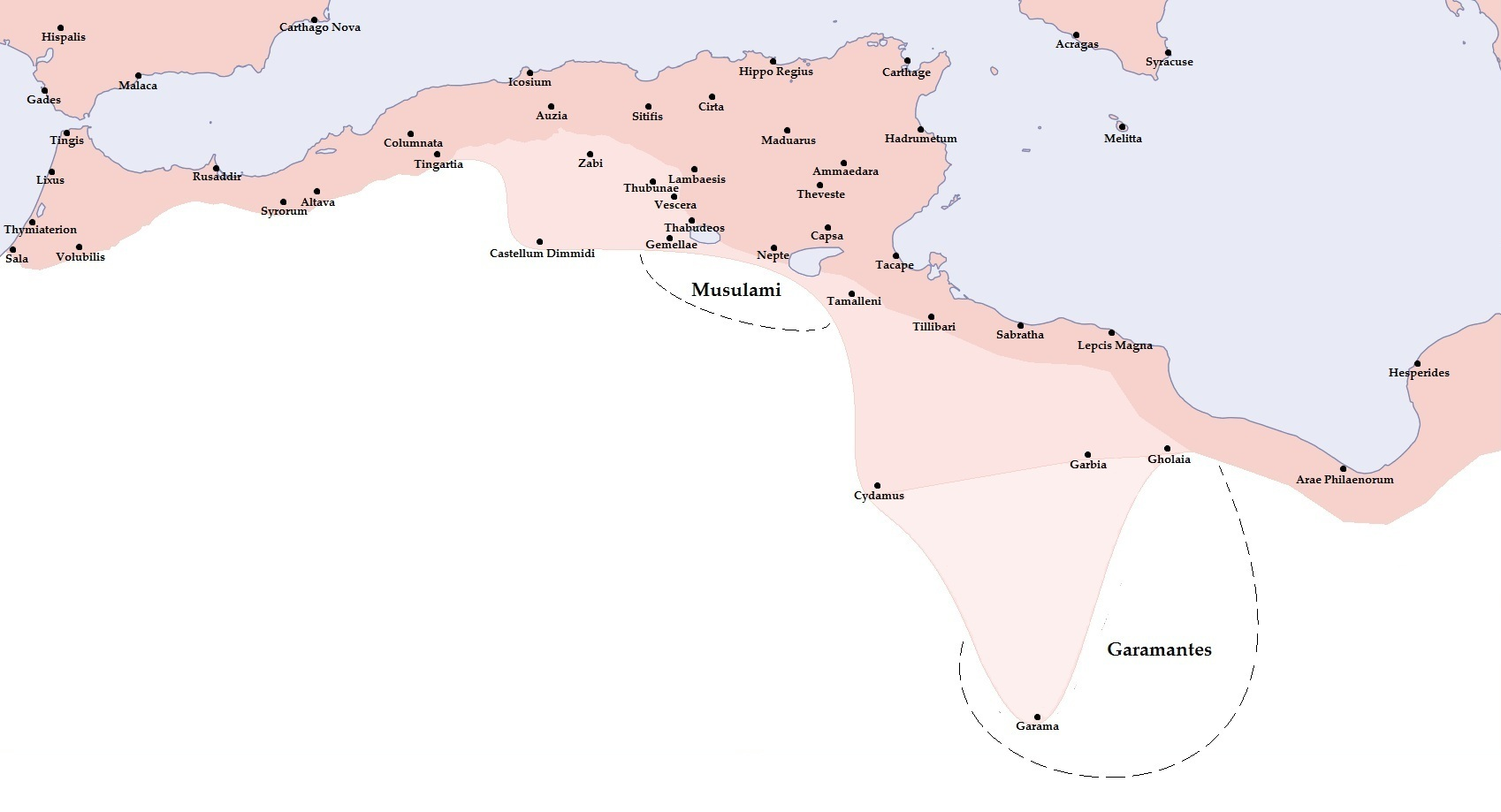
Faustus' campaigning between 197 and 202 AD greatly contributed to the expansion of the Limes Tripolitanus between Nepte and Golaia

For Mauretania there was a single wall with forts on both sides of it, the Limes Mauretaniae. In other places, such as Syria and Arabia Petraea, there was instead a network of border settlements and forts occupied by the Roman army.

- Limes Arabicus, (called the Limes Uranus) was the frontier of the Roman province of Arabia Petraea facing the desert.
- Limes Tripolitanus was the frontier in modern Libya facing the Sahara.
- Fossatum Africae
- Limes Mauretaniae
- Fossa regia

== Western borders ==
The western borders were mainly protected by the Atlantic coast and unfortified.

== See also ==
- Border barrier
- Defensive wall
- Natural frontiers
- Limes (Roman Empire)
- Limitanei, troops along the borders in the late Roman and early Byzantine periods.
- Sassanian defense lines
