= Limes Mauretaniae =

Former portion of a Roman border

The Limes Mauretaniae was a portion of a 4,000-kilometre (2,500 mi) Roman fortified border (limes) in Africa approximately 100 kilometres (62 mi) south of the modern day Algiers.

Stretching between Auzia (Sour El-Ghozlane, Algeria) and Numerus Syrorum (Maghnia, Algeria), it was a portion of the North African border fortification and security line of the Roman Empire which reached from the Atlantic coast to the Limes Tripolitanus in Tunisia.

== Function ==
In Roman North Africa there were no continuous border fortifications such as Hadrian's Wall in Britain. The transitions on the Limes Africanus between Roman territory and the free tribal areas were fluid and were monitored only by the garrisons of a few outposts. Their security tasks were further complicated by long communication lines and the lack of a clear border. The greatest danger was posed by the nomadic Berber tribes, which carried on sporadic warfare with Rome. The chain of forts was primarily intended to mark the Roman domain. In many areas, the system also served to control and channel the migratory movements of nomadic tribes or peoples, including the monitoring and reporting of their activities, and as a customs border. This Limes was therefore not so much a military border security system, but rather a monitored economic border with the free nomadic peoples and hill tribes. The Limes could not have withstood a coordinated military attack.

== History ==
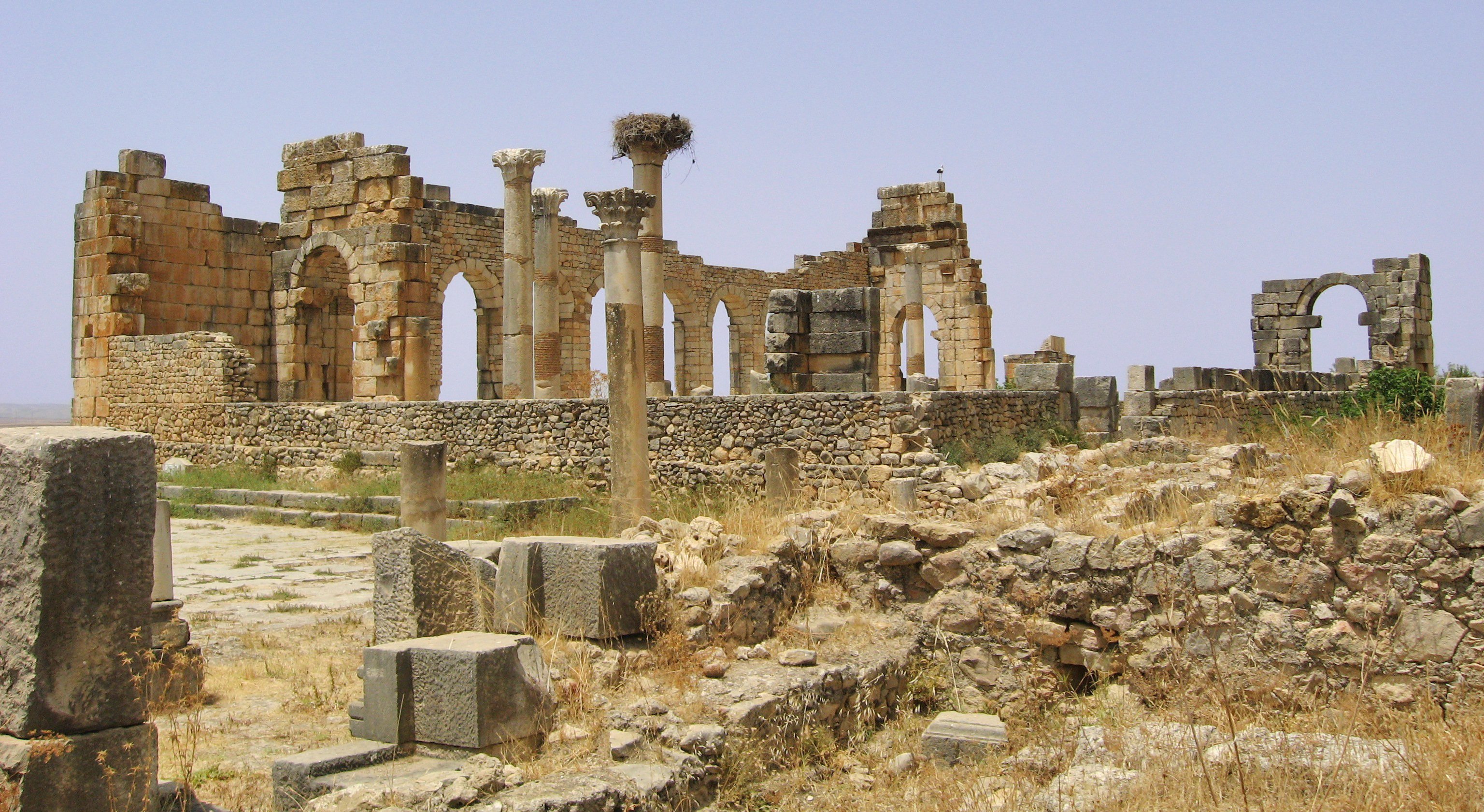
Roman Ruins in Volubilis, Morocco

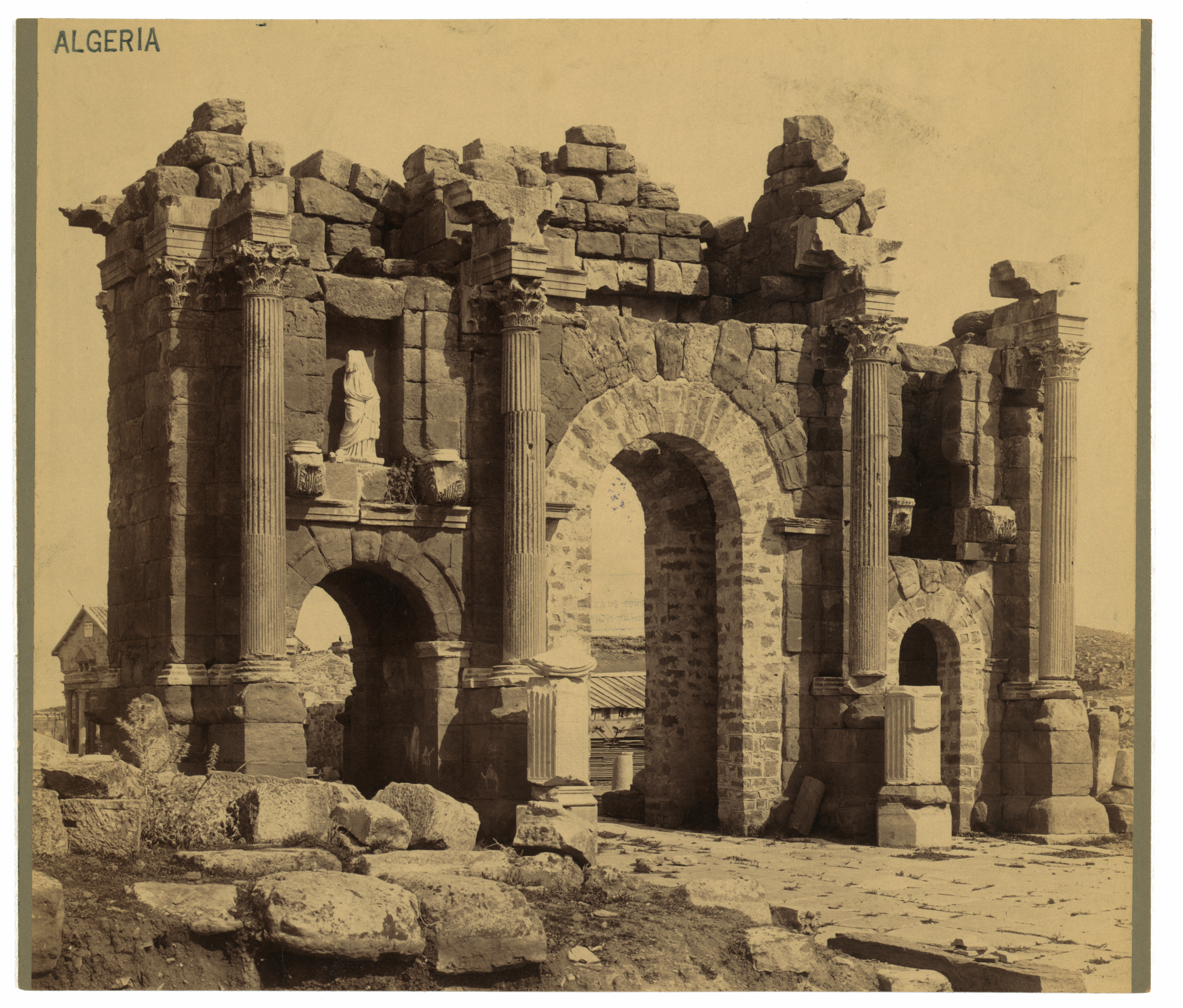
Ruins of the Roman Arch of Trajan at Thamugadi (Timgad), Algeria

During his civil war Julius Caesar defeated the partisans of Pompey at the Battle of Thapsus in 46 BC. After the battle the previously independent kingdom of Numidia, whose king, Juba I had sided with Pompey, was divided. Part of it was assigned to the Kingdom of Mauritania, and the other was added to the Roman province of Africa. The Kingdom of Mauritania was founded in 33 BC and bequeathed to Rome by King Bocchus II. The kingdom was initially under direct Roman rule. In 25 BC Augustus appointed Juba II as ruler of the client kingdom, but he did nothing to pacify the hinterland. In 23 AD his son Ptolemy succeeded him and put down an uprising against Rome. When Ptolemy visited Rome in 40 AD, however, Caligula had him murdered, and annexed the kingdom. The revolt that erupted was suppressed in 44 AD. Claudius divided the territory of the former kingdom into the provinces Mauretania Caesariensis, with its capital at Colonia Claudia Caesariensium Iol, now Cherchell, and Mauretania Tingitana, with its capital initially at Volubilis, and later at Tingis, today's Tangier.

In the African provinces, there was frequent unrest and uprisings during Roman rule. In 238 AD the governor of Africa, Gordian I, and his son Gordian II (as co-regent) were proclaimed against their will by the Roman Senate as the counter-emperor to Emperor Maximinus Thrax. However, their troops were defeated by the Legio III Augusta. Under Emperor Diocletian, the new province of Mauretania Sitifensis, named after its capital Sitifis (now Sétif), was separated from Mauretania Caesariensis.

In the 5th century, both provinces fell to the Vandals. Parts of Tingitana, Caesariensis, and Sitifensis were recaptured by the Byzantine Empire after the annihilation of the Vandal Kingdom by the Byzantine general Belisarius in the 6th century. Islamic expansion put an end to the rule of Byzantium in the 7th century.

== Topography ==
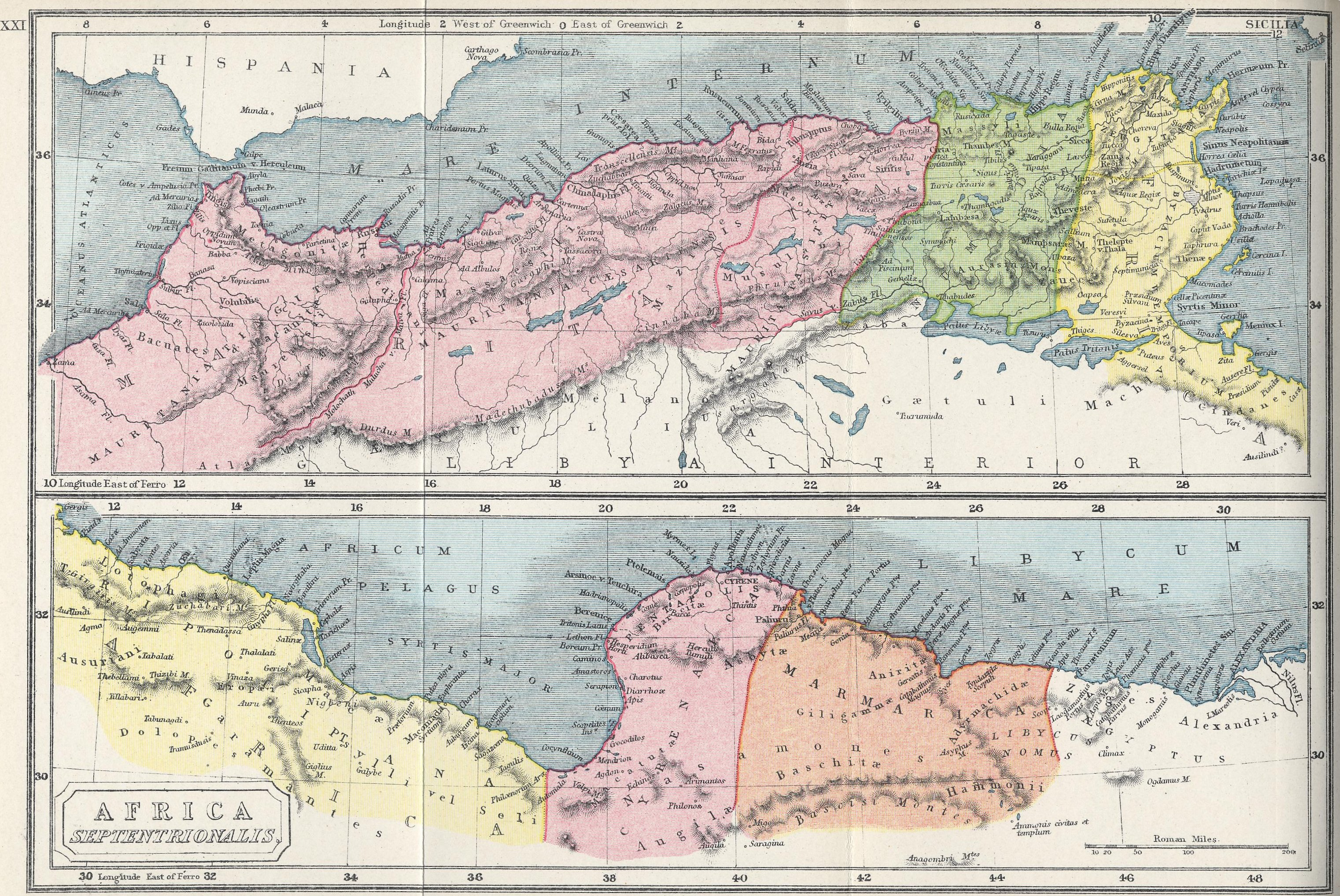
Map of North Africa in Roman times

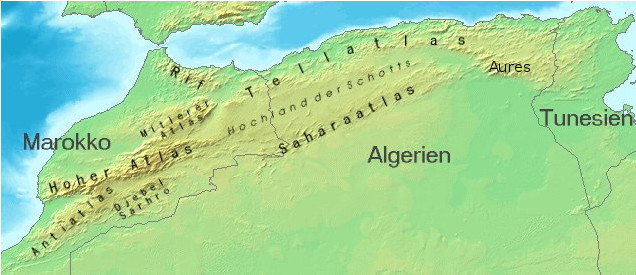
The Atlas Mountains

The North African Limes protected the provinces which stretched about 90 to 400 kilometres (56 to 249 mi) inland from the Mediterranean. The geography of the provinces of Mauretania Caesariensis and Mauretania Tingitana was roughly divided into a variable-width coastal strip, followed by some very fertile mountain regions or river valleys, fading gradually into a steppe and desert steppe border area and mountain regions. The inhabitants of Mauritania, particularly in the Tingitana, were probably semi-nomadic hill tribes related to the Iberians.

The eastern border of the province of Mauretania Caesariensis (identical to the eastern border of the later province of Sitifensis) ran approximately on a line west of Cape Bougaroun on the Ampsaga River to the east end of the Chott el Hodna and further west into the steppe landscape. This line also separated the sedentary population from the nomads, and formerly formed the border of the area dominated by Carthage. The southern border approached the coast along the northern slope of the Tell Atlas in the transition from Numidia to Mauretania Caesariensis. The Roman-dominated area thus shrank from a width of around 400 kilometres (250 mi) to only around 95 kilometres (59 mi). The more north-facing border in Mauretania Caesariensis was roughly in line with the precipitation limit required for agriculture. The Roman armed forces, which were only weakly represented here, were also decisive for the initial limitation of the territory.

The Roman area of influence, which was originally limited to the coast of Caesariensis, was extended further south for economic reasons into the Maghreb from the 1st to the 3rd century. This inevitably led to unrest among the local population, who feared for their livelihood. In the west, the River Malva (Moulouya) formed the border with the province of Mauretania Tingitana.

An extensive barren plain separates Algeria from Morocco. In the north, the foothills of the Rif Mountains drop steeply into the sea, preventing a direct land connection along the coast. The connection between Caesaria and Tingis was therefore normally maintained by sea, since there were no areas between the two provinces that were economically used by the Romans.

Roman influence and control in the province of Mauretania Tingitana stretched along the Atlantic coast to the Sala River (Bou Regreg) near Sala Colonia and the Atlas plateau around Volubilis, an area with high agricultural yield. The northern Rif and Atlas Mountains, however, were never permanently occupied by the military.

The road network established by the Romans in North Africa ensured good and timely logistical connections for the trade and supply of their widely deployed troops. In Caesariensis there were three traffic routes running parallel to the coast. As a rule, however, the surfaces were unpaved. Natural traffic routes—like rivers—were not available in the province of Caesariensis. The border of the steppe was well developed for military reasons.

== Economy ==
The main export products of both Mauretanian provinces were wood and purple dye as well as agricultural products. Tingitana exported wild animals for the circus games. The Moorish tribesmen resident here were eagerly recruited as auxiliary troops, especially as light cavalry. The residents of the coast lived in a symbiotic relationship with the nomads of the steppe and the hill tribes. At the beginning of the dry season, nomads and hill tribes moved to the coastal regions, hired themselves out as workers, and exchanged agricultural products for animals from their herds.

== Border and fortifications ==
Rome's struggle against the barbarians was always characterized by the numerical superiority of the opponent. Rome was often forced to compensate for its inferiority through the use of technology. The Limes of the two Mauritanian provinces was not a continuous fortified border wall because of the considerable distance from the Atlantic to the eastern border of the province of Caesariensis. Instead, there were barriers (clausura) in the valleys of the Atlas, ditches (fossata), ramparts, and a series of watchtowers and castles. The installations were connected by a road network laid out on strategic considerations. The border security system was largely adapted to the circumstances of the topography, but also to the behavior and lifestyle of the ethnic groups living at that location, and was therefore hardly fortified in spots. The expansion of the border in Mauritania was intensified at the beginning of the 1st century AD and expanded somewhat further to the south until the 3rd century.

East of the Monts du Hodna there was a system of clausurae, the Fossatum Africae, which "consisted of a ditch, wall, watch-towers, and gates." This system is believed to date from the time of Hadrian, around the 120s AD. There are at least three separate sections of the fossatum; this section is the longest at around 87 miles (140 km) The fossatum "consists of a single ditch 4 to 6 m (13 to 20 ft) wide and 2.3 to 2.4 m (7 ft 7 in to 7 ft 10 in) deep, with a low wall not more than 2.5 m (8 ft 2 in) high." In general the priority was to seal off the mountainous area by using natural obstacles. The Roman-occupied area of the province of Mauretania Caesariensis was defined by a line of fortifications running along the Chelif River (Chinalaph). This was secured by a series of watchtowers, built by Hadrian, around 30 to 50 kilometres (19 to 31 mi) apart. The small depth of the controlled area suggests that the hill tribes resident here could never be subjugated. In the northwest of the province, the Rif Mountains drop steeply into the sea, preventing a direct land connection between the provinces. Beginning around 197 AD, the Severan emperors built a series of forts in western Caesariensis on the northern border of the plateau. The last fort in this series was Numerus Syrorum (modern Maghnia); it was west of the Tlemcen Mountains. The Hadrianic chain of forts on the Chelif River now served as an additional barrier and defense line.

Mauretania Tingitana was difficult to control and defend due to its topography. In the northeast, the tribes of the Rif Mountains were a constant concern. Initially, there was no security line with watchtowers to better monitor the massif. The south-east trending and up to 4,000-metre (13,000 ft) high Atlas runs abruptly into the Sahara on its eastern side. None of these regions could be conquered by Rome. Likewise, the easily accessible coastal areas of central and southern Morocco south of Rabat remained outside the Roman sphere of influence.

The line of forts in Tingitana was mainly oriented towards the coast, or at least close to the coast, and was used to ward off Moorish attacks and pirate raids from the Rif and the Atlas. Because of the pirate threat, both coastal protection and the inland river Sububus (Sebou) were strengthened from the 2nd century onwards by the construction of forts in Thamusida, Iulia Valentia Banasa, and Tremuli (Souk El Arbaa). The Roman troops of the province were concentrated mainly in the forts on the coast and around the provincial metropolis of Volubilis. Sala and Volubilis, however, were outside the area protected by the forts on the river. Volubilis was exposed inland and therefore required major defense efforts. From the second half of the 2nd century, a city wall and numerous castra and observation posts served to protect the city. On the coast, the Sala was closed off from the Atlantic to the Bou Regreg by an 11-kilometre (6.8 mi)-long moat, which was partially reinforced with a wall, four small forts, and around 15 watchtowers. Additional forts were built in Tamuda (Tétouan), Souk El Arbaa, and Oppidum Novum (Ksar el-Kebir) on the Atlantic and Mediterranean coasts.

Due to increasing attacks by local tribes, the border in Tingitana was withdrawn to the line Frigidae (Azib el Harrak)–Thamusida under Diocletian in the second half of the 3rd century. The area around Volubilis was abandoned, while the city of Sala was probably kept until the early 4th century.

In the beginning of the principate forts were rather rare in the provinces because the troops were deployed over a wide area. The forts and watchtowers that were built later were mostly rectangular and occupied 0.12 to 0.5 hectares (0.30 to 1.24 acres). The smaller military posts, called fortlets or burgi, had a size of only 0.01–0.10 ha (0.025–0.247 acres), reinforced walls, no windows and only a small garrison. They were strategically located in the area and were used, among other things, to send messages by exchanging signals with the neighboring forts.

== Armed forces ==
For defense and protection against uprisings and raids by nomadic and hill tribes, the Legio III Augusta was the only legion in North Africa outside of Egypt since the time of Augustus. This might initially appear to be spreading the forces too thinly, but was based on the economic assessment of the defense worthiness of arable land in contrast to regions of less importance that justified a less expensive defense effort. So, during Hadrian's visit in 128 extensive sections of the border areas along the deserts were not monitored by the Romans at all. The existing armed forces had the task of protecting the border line against raids from the steppe, mountain, and desert areas, but on the other hand they were not allowed to pose a threat to Rome. This balancing assessment between sufficient military means to avert an external danger and at the same time avoid an internal threat applied in principle to all provinces. Although the military potential was apparently temporarily overwhelmed, the legion and auxiliary units in North Africa were basically able to fulfill their mission.

Until the early 1st century AD, except in Ammaedara (Haïdra), there were no fixed military bases. Legionary and auxiliary units of the province were mainly stationed near the coast or in port cities. The Legion's location changed several times over time for strategic reasons, first from Ammaedara to Theveste (Tébessa) and finally to Lambaesis. Under Gordian III, the legion was dissolved in 238 AD due to the successful suppression of a revolt under Gordian I and II, but was reconstituted around 256 during the reign of Emperor Valerian. In the meantime, depending on the threat level, the armed forces were briefly strengthened at times. In this way, in the time of Tiberius, the Legio IX Hispana moved temporarily from Pannonia to North Africa in 17 AD to fight against the rebellion of Tacfarinas. Later Antoninus Pius again temporarily increased troop strength in Mauretania due a rebellion.

In the 2nd century, the auxiliary forces consisted of three alae and ten cohorts, a total of around 7,000 men, in Caesariensis, and five alae and at least ten cohorts, a total of around 8,000 men, in Tingitana. The auxiliary units were made up of soldiers from Gaul, Italy, and North Africa. From the 4th century, Berber tribal groups were increasingly recruited. However, the number of troops changed only slightly. In the provinces, however, the 1:1 ratio between the legions and the auxiliary units that was normally aimed for was not maintained; it was significantly less favorable.

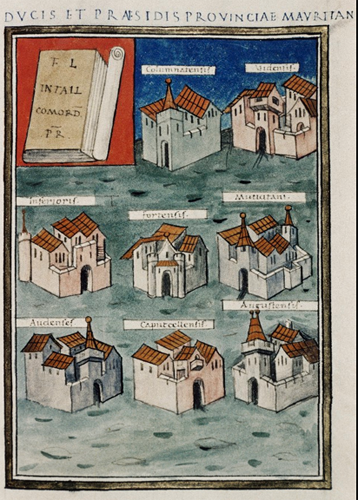
Frontispiece from the section Dux et praeses provinciae Mauritaniae et Caesariensis in the Notitia Dignitatum

In late antiquity, according to Notitia Dignitatum three commanders had command authority over the troops stationed at this Limes (Limitanei and Comitatenses). These were:

- for Tingitaniam (western Algeria, Morocco) of the Comes Tingitaniae
- for intra Africam (Tunisia, Algeria, western Libya) the Dux et praeses provinciae Mauritaniae et Caesariensis.
- The latter was under the command of the Comes Africae, the commander of the African field army, the Comitatenses.

== Fleet ==
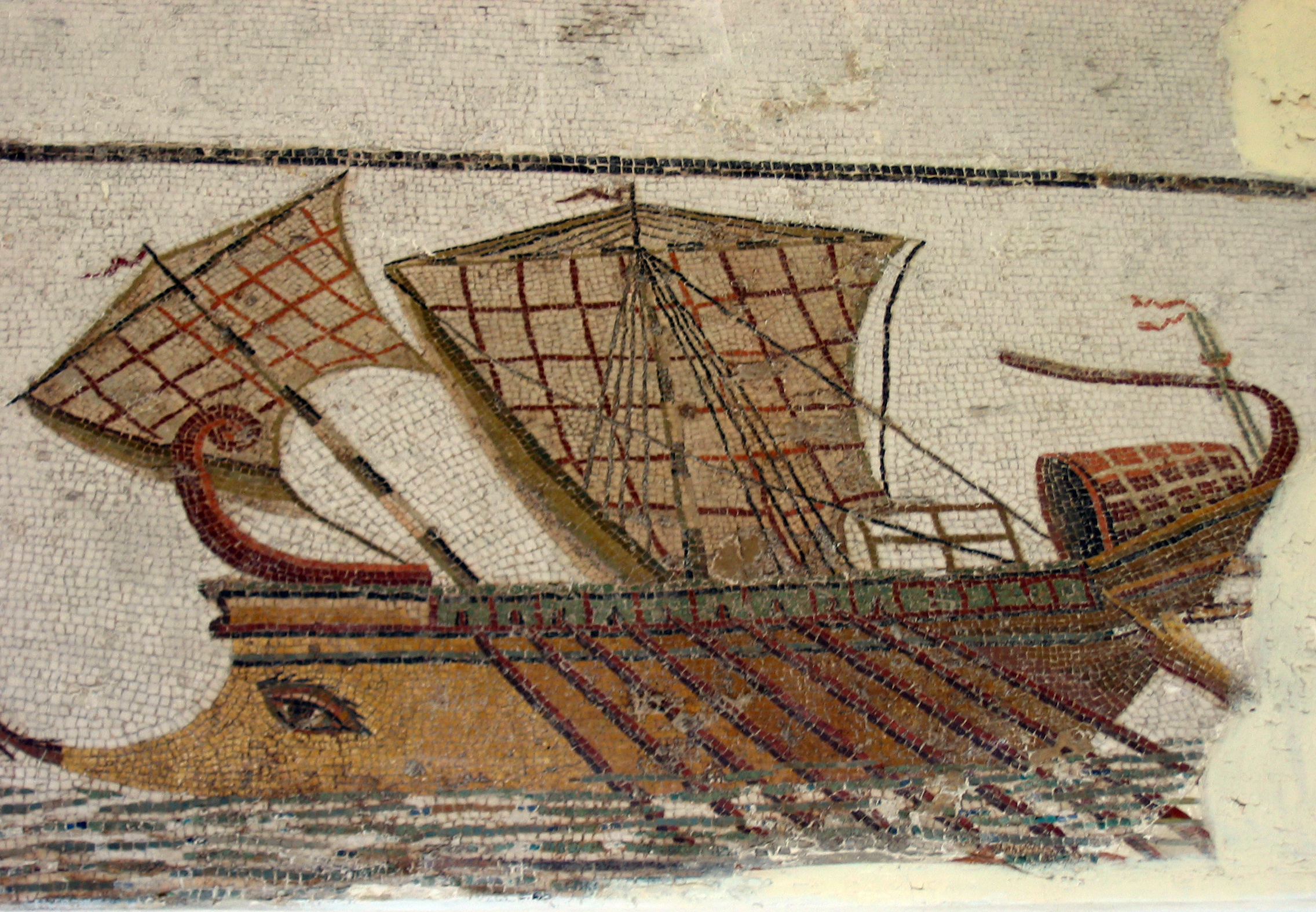
Roman trireme Mosaic, Tunisia

Since Marcus Aurelius Rome, the undisputed saw naval power in the Mediterranean, was forced because of the ubiquitous pirate threat to station its own naval force in Caesarea under the command of a dux per Africam, Numidiam et Mauretaniam. The Mauritanian fleet (classis Mauretanica) was in existence since the end of the 2nd century AD (it was probably built around 176 AD). It was most likely Liburnians, with a trireme as the flagship. Initially only one squadron, composed of units from the Syrian and Alexandrian fleets, as an intervention force, this fleet ultimately turned out to be too weak to effectively prevent the raids of the Moors on Hispanic people that began after 170 AD. The fleet was used to protect the Northwest African and Spanish areas, especially the province of Baetica. Its other duties included securing the Strait of Gibraltar and escorting troops and goods from Europe to Africa. Its main base was in the provincial metropolis of Caesarea (Cherchell), further bases were in:

- Cartennae (Ténès),
- Icosium (Algiers),
- Portus Magnus (Arzew/Bethioua),
- Saldae (Béjaïa) and
- Tipasa (Tipaza)

== See also ==
- Fossatum Africae
- Roman military frontiers and fortifications
