= Africa (Roman province) =

Roman province in North Africa

Africa Proconsularis
- Province of the Roman Republic and Roman Empire
- 146 BC – AD 439; 534–698
- The province of Africa within the Roman Empire
- Capital: Zama Regia, Utica, then Carthago
- Historical era: Classical antiquity, Late antiquity, Early Middle Ages
  - Established after the Third Punic War: 146 BC
  - Vandal Conquest of Carthage: 439 AD
  - Byzantine reconquest by Vandalic War: 534
  - Reorganization into the Exarchate: 591
  - Fall of Carthage: 698
Preceded by	Succeeded by
Ancient Carthage; Numidia	Vandal Kingdom; Ifriqiya
- Today part of: Tunisia; Libya; Algeria

Africa was a Roman province on the northern coast of the continent of Africa. It was established in 146 BC, following the Roman Republic's conquest of Carthage in the Third Punic War. It roughly comprised the territory of present-day Tunisia, the northeast of Algeria, and the coast of western Libya along the Gulf of Sidra. The territory was originally and still is inhabited by Berbers, known in Latin as the Numidae and Maurii, indigenous to all of North Africa west of Egypt. In the 9th century BC, Semitic-speaking Phoenicians from the Levant built coastal settlements across the Mediterranean to support and expand their shipping networks. In the 8th century BC, the settlement of Carthage became the predominant Phoenician colony. Rome began expanding into Africa after annexing Carthage in 146 BC at the end of the Punic Wars, and into Numidia from 25 BC, establishing Roman colonies in the region.

Africa was one of the wealthiest provinces in the Roman Empire, second only to Italy. It was said that Africa fed the Roman populace for eight months of the year, while Egypt provided the remaining four months' supply. The area east of the Fossa Regia was fully Romanized with one third of the population made of Italian colonists and their descendants, the other two thirds were Romanized Berbers, who were all Christians and nearly all Latin speaking.

The Roman Empire during the reign of Hadrian (ruled 117–138 AD), showing the senatorial province of Africa Proconsularis (E. Algeria/Tunisia/Tripolitania). 1 legion deployed in 125

== History ==
Rome's first province in North Africa was established by the Roman Republic in 146 BC, following its conquest of Carthage by Scipio Aemilianus in the Third Punic War.

Utica, which had sided with Rome against Carthage, was made the administrative capital. The remaining territory was left in the domain of the Berber Numidian king Massinissa. At this time, the Roman policy in Africa appears to have been to prevent a rival great power rising in Western North Africa.

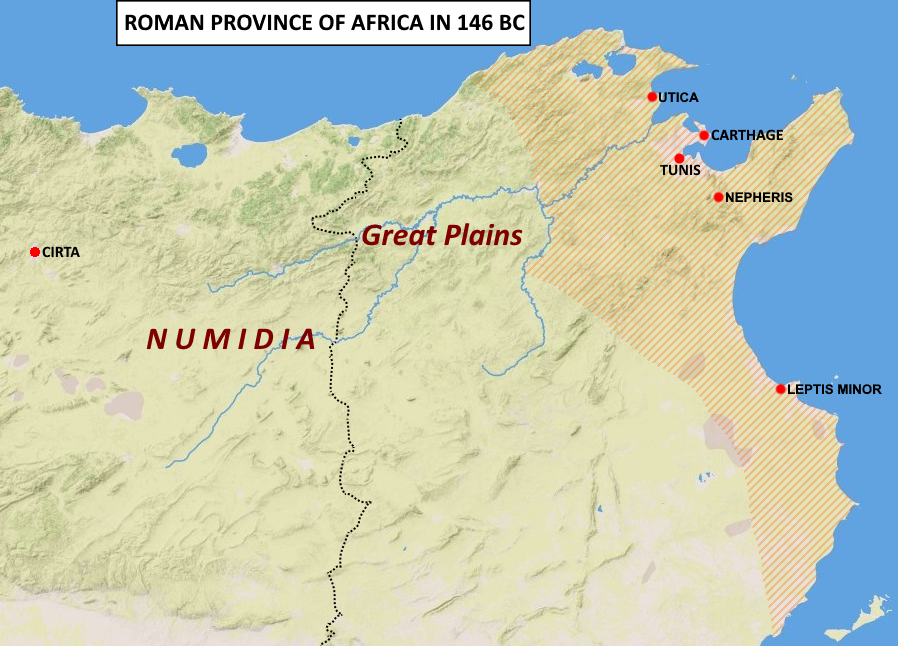
Roman Province of Africa in 146 BC

In 118 BC, the Numidian king Micipsa died and split the kingdom among his three heirs: Jugurtha, Hiempsal I and Adherbal. Hiempsal was assassinated in 117 BC; Adherbal fled to Rome to request protection and the intervention of the Roman Senate. In 112 BC, Jugurtha resumed the civil war and defeated Adherbal at Cirta, and embarked on the Jugurthine War against Rome (111–106 BC). Following Jugurtha's defeat, his former territory was placed under the control of the Berber Mauritanian king Bocchus.

During Caesar's civil war (49–45 BC), Caesar created a new African province, Africa nova, from territory taken from the Numidians. The original province was called Africa vetus. During the Second Triumvirate, the two provinces were unified, possibly in 35 BC, in consequence of border conflicts. Roman governors of the province won three triumphs between 34 and 28 BC. Further expansion of the province continued under the emperor Augustus, with conflicts recorded through to AD 6. Under the Augustan constitutional reforms, in 27 BC the region was made a senatorial province, and eventually became known as Africa proconsularis (as it was ruled by a senatorial proconsul rather than an imperial legate).

After Diocletian's administrative reforms, the province was split into Africa Zeugitana (which retained the name Africa Proconsularis, as it was governed by a proconsul) in the north, Africa Byzacena (corresponding to eastern Tunisia) to the south, and Africa Tripolitania (corresponding to southern Tunisia and northwest Libya) to the south and southeast of Africa Byzacena, all of which were part of the Dioecesis Africae. Old Africa (Africa Vetus), which generally includes the areas mentioned, was also known by the Romans (Pliny) as Africa propria, of which Carthage was the capital.

The region remained part of the Roman empire until the Germanic migrations of the 5th century AD. The Vandals crossed into Northwest Africa from Spain in AD 429, had conquered the region by AD 439, founding a kingdom which also included Corsica, Sardinia and the Balearics. The Vandals controlled the country as a warrior-elite but faced strong resistance from the native Berbers. The Vandals also persecuted Chalcedonian Roman Africans and Berbers, as the Vandals were adherents of Arianism (the semi-trinitarian doctrines of Arius, a priest of Egypt). Towards the end of the 5th century, Vandal control over the area diminished, abandoning most of the interior territories to the Mauri and other Berber tribes of the region.

In AD 533, emperor Justinian, using a Vandal dynastic dispute as pretext, sent an army under the general Belisarius to recover Africa. In a year-long campaign, Belisarius defeated the Vandals, entered Carthage in triumph and re-established Roman rule over the province. The restored Roman administration was successful in fending off the attacks of the Amazigh desert tribes, and by means of an extensive fortification network managed to extend its rule once again to the interior.

From AD 534–91, the northwest African provinces were grouped together with the Byzantine province of Spania into the Praetorian prefecture of Africa, this time separate from Praetorian prefecture of Italy. In AD 591, this was replaced by emperor Maurice with the Exarchate of Africa. The Exarchate prospered. Heraclius the Elder, the Exarch of Africa, and his son Heraclius, overthrew the emperor Phocas at Constantinople in AD 610. Heraclius briefly considered moving the imperial capital from Constantinople to Carthage.

Following Heraclius' death in AD 641, the exarchate continued to operate. In AD 698, the Muslim Umayyad army, under general Hassan ibn al-Nu'man al-Ghassani conquered Carthage and defeated the Exarchate, ending Roman and Christian rule in Northwest Africa and establishing Islamic rule in the region.

=== Timetable ===
Evolution of the province of Africa
Pre-Roman Conquest	Carthage			Eastern Numidia (Massylii)	Western Numidia (Masaesyli)		Mauretania
146 BC – 105 BC	Africa			Numidia			Mauretania
105 BC – 46 BC	Africa			Eastern Numidia	Western Numidia	Mauretania	
46 BC – 40 BC	Africa Vetus			Africa Nova	Western Numidia	Eastern Mauretania	Western Mauretania
40 BC – 30 BC	Africa Vetus			Africa Nova		Eastern Mauretania	Western Mauretania
30 BC – 25 BC	Africa Vetus			Numidia		Mauretania	
25 BC – 41 AD	Africa Proconsularis				Mauretania		
41 AD – 193 AD	Africa Proconsularis				Mauretania Caesariensis		Mauretania Tingitana
193 AD – 314 AD	Africa Proconsularis			Numidia	Mauretania Caesariensis		Mauretania Tingitana
since 314 AD	Tripolitania	Africa Byzacena	Africa Zeugitana	Numidia	Mauretania Sitifensis	Mauretania Caesariensis	Mauretania Tingitana

Legend

Roman 'direct' control, i.e. excluding vassal/client states.
- Mauretania Tingitana belonged to Diocese of Spain under Praetorian prefecture of Gaul, rather than Diocese of Africa under Praetorian prefecture of Italy, from Diocletianic provincial reforms to Vandalic conquest, i.e. during the rule of Western Roman Empire in a broader sense.

== Roman Africans ==
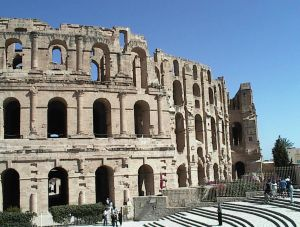
The amphitheatre of Thysdrus (modern El Djem)

The Roman military presence of Northwest Africa was relatively small, consisting of about 28,000 troops and auxiliaries in Numidia and the two Mauretanian provinces. Starting in the 2nd century AD, these garrisons were manned mostly by local inhabitants. A sizable Latin-speaking population developed that was multinational in background, sharing the northwest African region with those speaking Punic and Berber languages. Imperial security forces began to be recruited from the local population, including the Berbers.

Abun-Nasr, in his A History of the Maghrib, said:

"What made the Berbers accept the Roman way of life all the more readily was that the Romans, though a colonizing people who captured their lands by the might of their arms, did not display any racial exclusiveness and were remarkably tolerant of Berber religious cults, be they indigenous or borrowed from the Carthaginians. However, the Roman territory in Africa was unevenly penetrated by Roman culture. Pockets of non-Romanized Berbers continued to exist throughout the Roman period, even such as in the rural areas of the deeply romanised regions of Tunisia and Numidia."

By the end of the Western Roman Empire nearly all of the Maghreb was fully romanised, according to Mommsen in his The Provinces of the Roman Empire. Roman Africans enjoyed a high level of prosperity. This prosperity (and romanisation) touched partially even the populations living outside the Roman limes (mainly the Garamantes and the Getuli), who were reached with Roman expeditions to Sub-Saharan Africa.

The willing acceptance of Roman citizenship by members of the ruling class in African cities produced such Roman Africans as the comic poet Terence, the rhetorician Fronto of Cirta, the jurist Salvius Julianus of Hadrumetum, the novelist Apuleius of Madauros, the emperor Septimius Severus of Leptis Magna, the Christians Tertullian and Cyprian of Carthage, and Arnobius of Sicca and his pupil Lactantius; the angelic doctor Augustine of Thagaste, the epigrammatist Luxorius of Vandal Carthage, and perhaps the biographer Suetonius, and the poet Dracontius.

— Paul MacKendrick, The North African Stones Speak (1969), UNC Press, 2000, p.326

== Economy ==
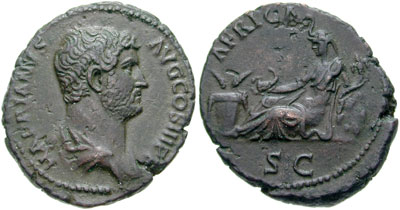
Roman as of Hadrian, 136 AD. An allegory of Africa wearing an elephant headdress is depicted on the reverse.

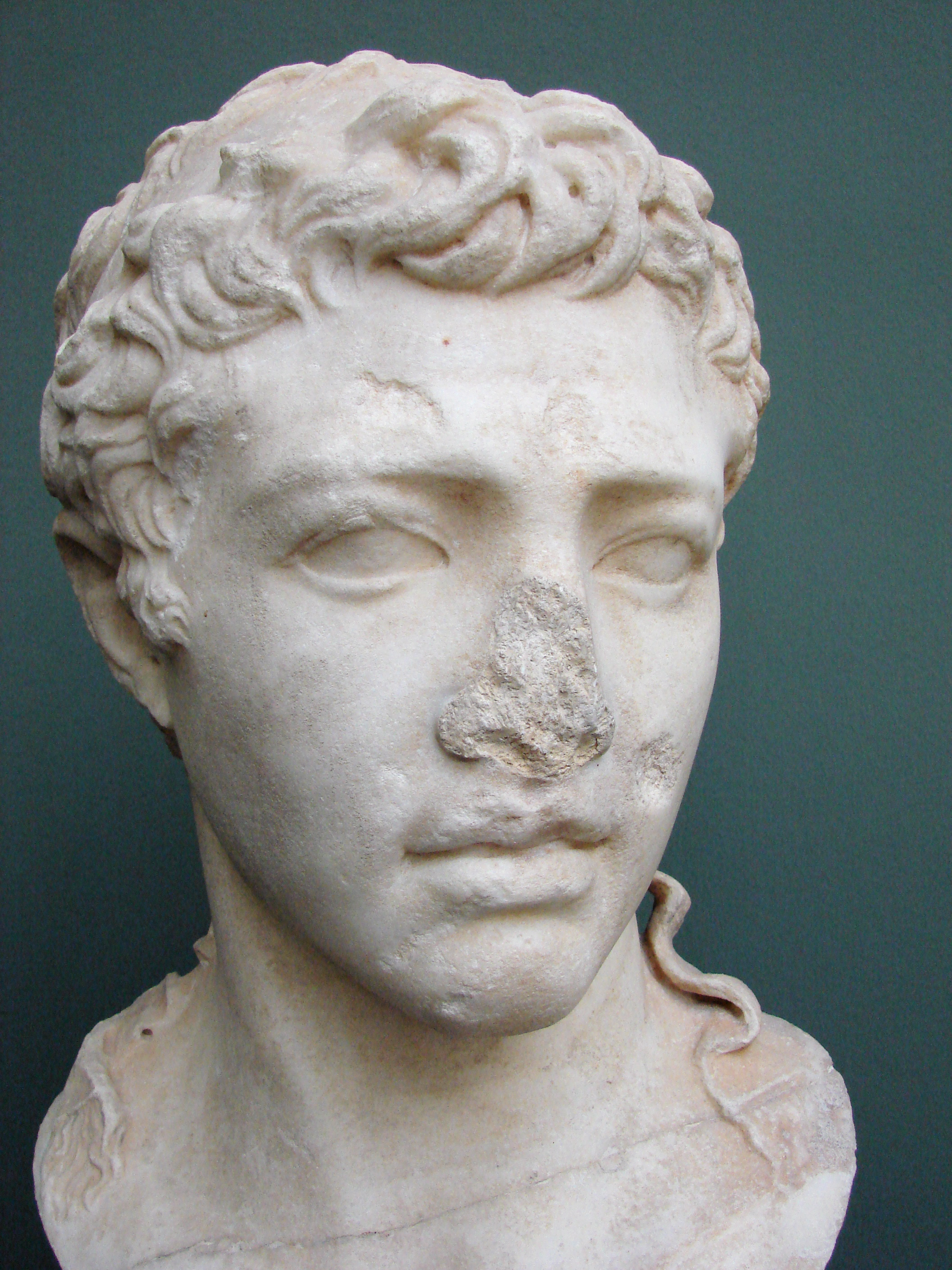
Juba II, king of Mauretania

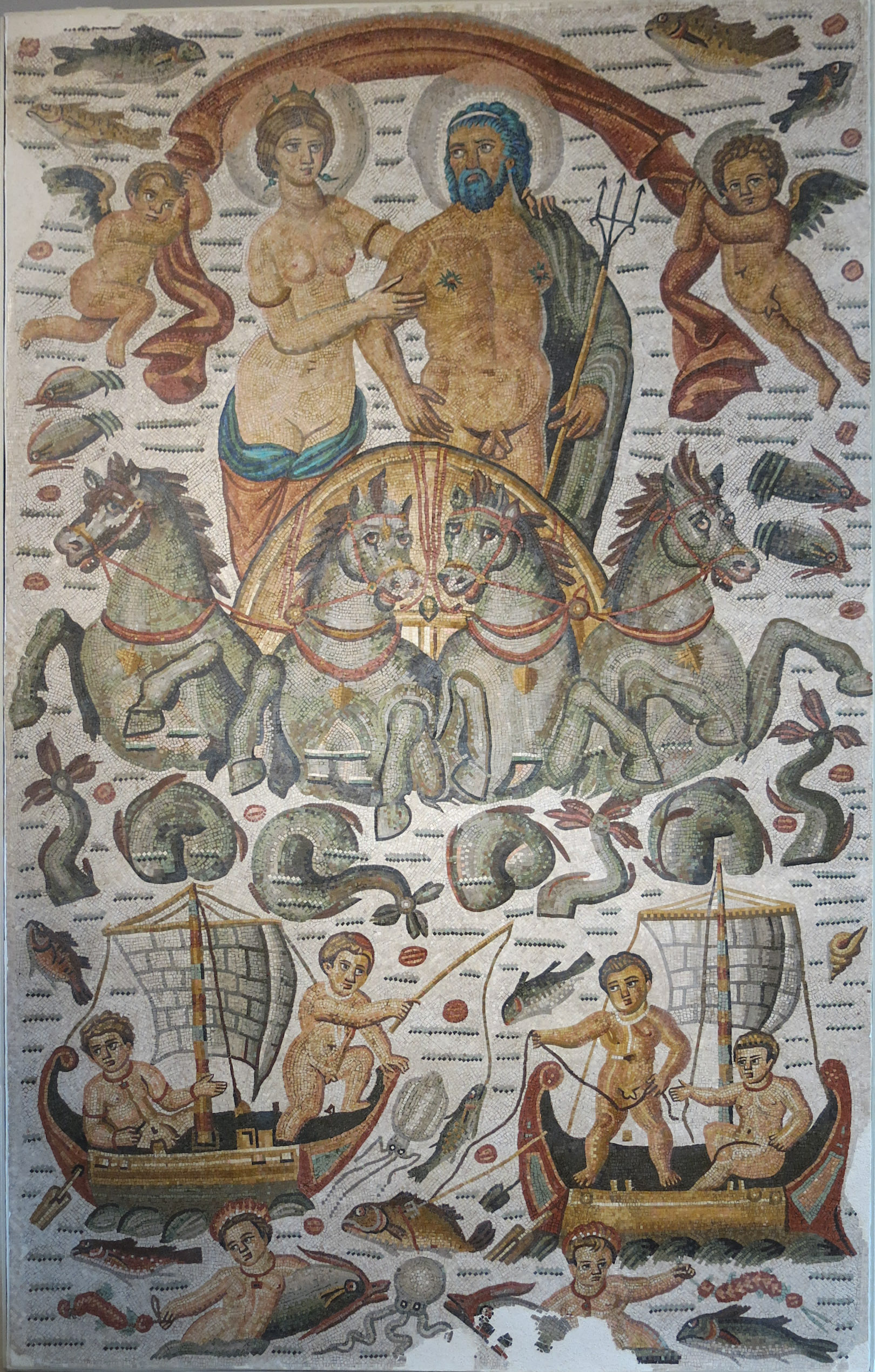
Triumph of Poseidon and Amphitrite showing the couple in procession, detail of a vast mosaic from Cirta, Roman Africa (c. 315–325 AD, now at the Louvre)

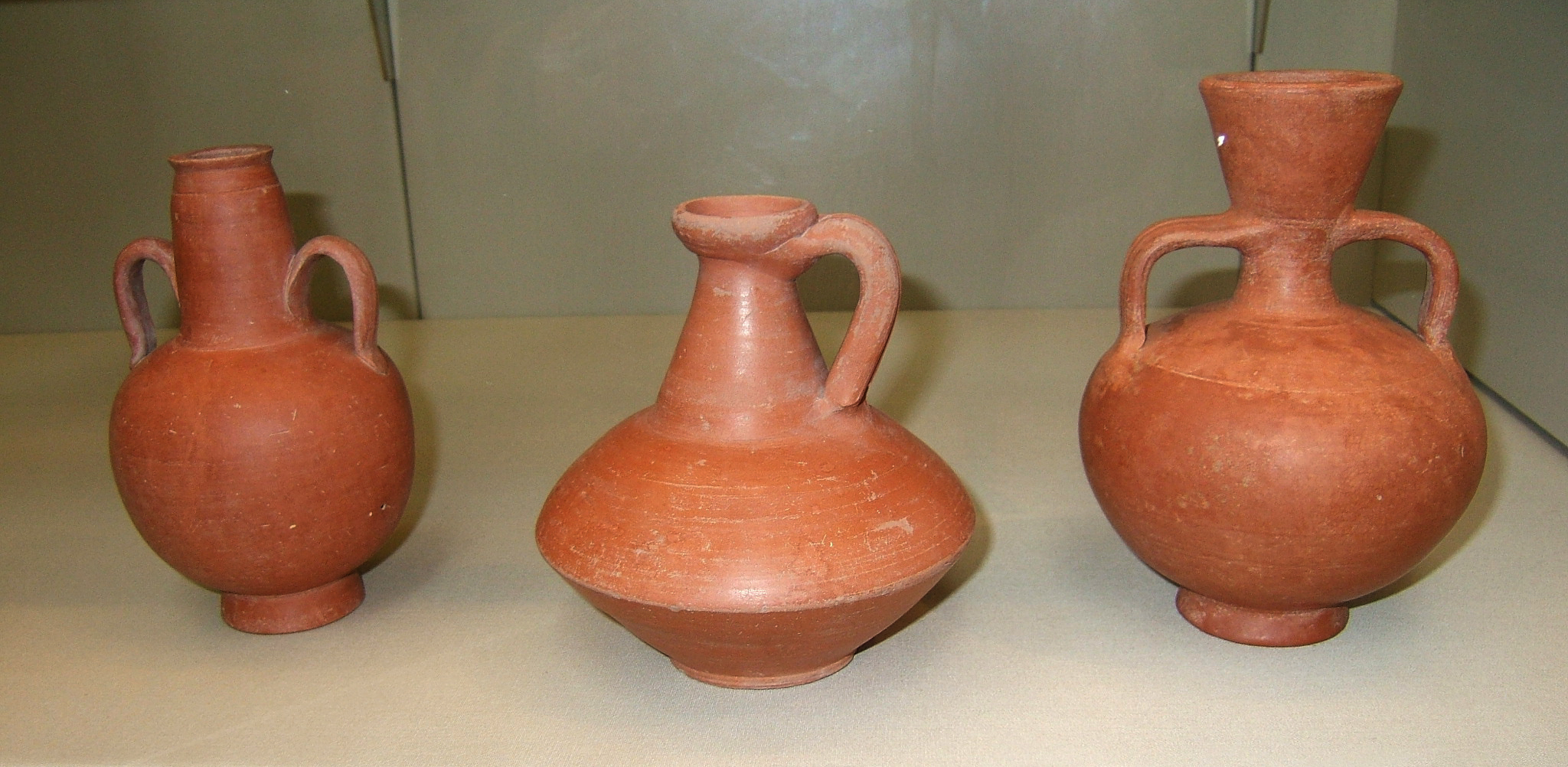
Berber Red Slip flagons and vases, 2nd–4th centuries

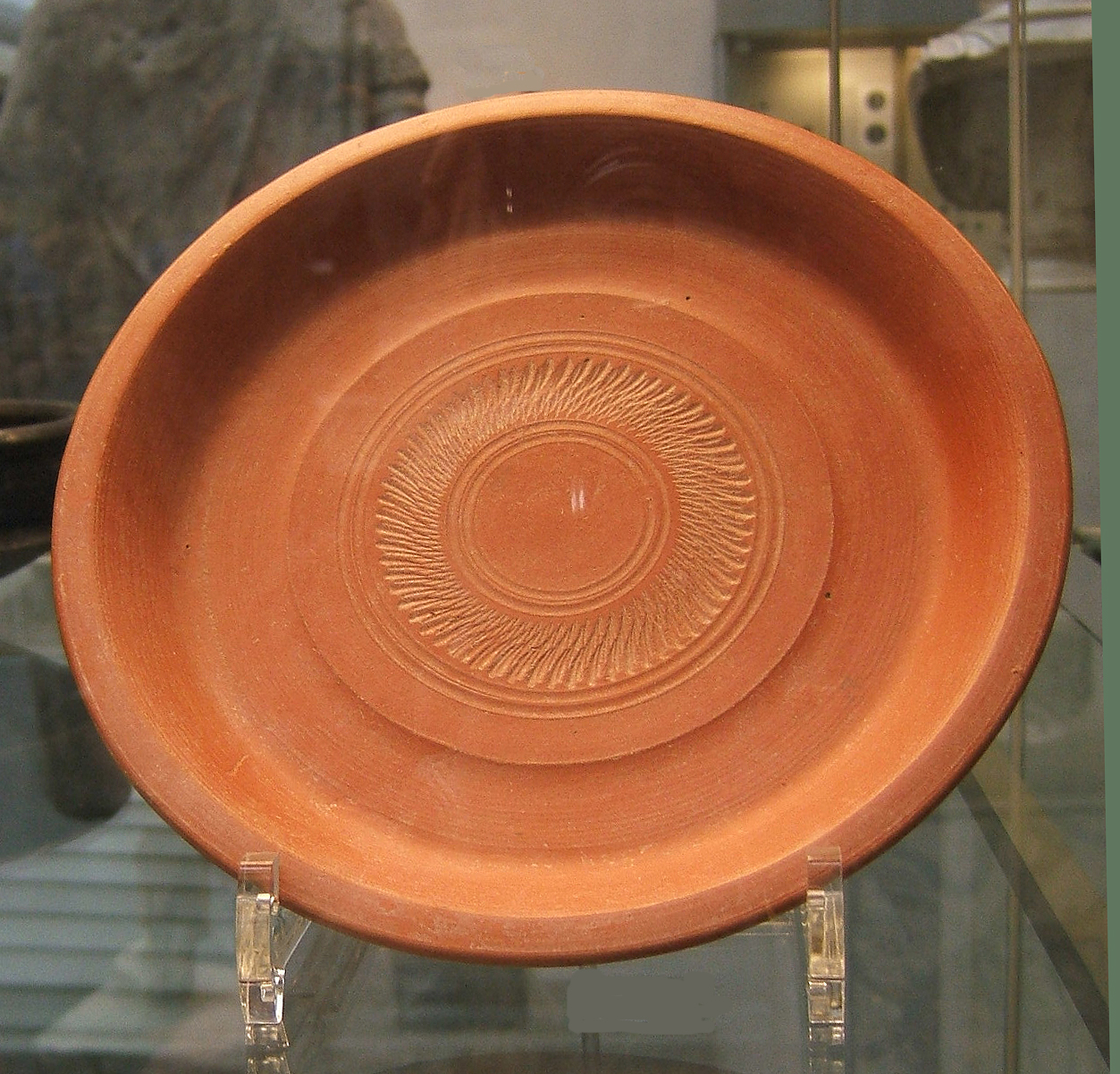
A typical plain berber Red Slip dish with simple rouletted decoration, 4th century

The prosperity of most towns depended on agriculture. Described as the "granary of the empire", it was said that Africa fed the Roman populace for eight months of the year, while Egypt provided the remaining four months' supply. Northwest Africa, according to one estimate, produced one million tons of cereals each year, one-quarter of which was exported. Additional crops included beans, figs, grapes, and other fruits. By the 2nd century BC, olive oil rivaled cereals as an export item. Principal production and export goods included textiles, marble, wine, timber, livestock, pottery (such as African Red Slip), and wool, as well as enslaved people, and the capture and transporting of exotic wild animals.

The incorporation of colonial cities into the Roman Empire brought an unparalleled degree of urbanization to vast areas of territory, particularly in Northwest Africa. This level of rapid urbanization had a structural impact on the town economy, and artisan production in Roman cities became closely tied to agrarian spheres of production. As Rome's population grew, so did the city's demand for Northwest African produce. This flourishing trade allowed the Northwest African provinces to increase artisan production in rapidly developing cities, making them highly organized urban centers. Many Roman cities shared both consumer and producer model city aspects, as artisanal activity was directly related to the economic role cities played in long-distance trade networks.

The urban population became increasingly engaged in the craft and service sectors and less in agrarian employment, until a significant portion of the town's vitality came from the sale or trade of products through middlemen to markets in areas both rural and abroad. The changes that occurred in the infrastructure for agricultural processing, like olive oil and wine production, as trade continued to develop both cities and commerce directly influenced the volume of artisan production. The scale, quality, and demand for these products reached its acme in Roman Northwest Africa.

=== Pottery production ===
The Northwest African provinces spanned across regions rich with olive plantations and potters' clay sources, which led to the early development of fine Ancient Roman pottery, especially African Red Slip terra sigillata tableware and clay oil lamp manufacture, as a crucial industry. Lamps provided the most common form of artificial illumination in Rome. They were used for public and private lighting, as votive offerings in temples, lighting at festivals, and as grave goods. As the craft developed and increased in quality and craftsmanship, the Northwest African creations began to rival their Italian and Grecian models and eventually surpassed them in merit and in demand.

The innovative use of molds around the 1st century BC allowed workshops to produce pottery in a greater variety of shapes and decorative styles. The skill of the lamp maker was demonstrated by the quality of decoration typically found on the flat top of the lamp, or discus, and the outer rim, or shoulder. The production process took several stages. Decorative motifs were created using small individual molds, and were then added as appliqué to the plain archetype of the lamp. The embellished lamp was then used to make two plaster half-molds: one lower half and one upper half mold. Using this pair of molds, multiple copies could be mass-produced. Decorative motifs varied depending on the lamp's function and popular taste.

Ornate patterning of squares and circles was later added to the shoulder with a stylus, as well as palm trees, small fish, animals, and flower patterns. The discus was reserved for conventional scenes of gods, goddesses, mythological subjects, scenes from daily life, erotic scenes, and natural images. In post-Roman instances of Northwest African lamps, Christian influences also appear, with images of saints, crosses, and biblical figures becoming commonly used motifs. Traditional mythological symbols continued to remain popular as well, some of which may be traced back to the Punic period. Many of the early Northwest African lamps that have been excavated, especially those of high quality, have the name of the manufacturer inscribed on the base, which gives evidence of a highly competitive and thriving local market that developed early and continued to influence and bolster the economy.

==== African Terra Sigillata ====
Artisanal, political, and social disruption in the 3rd century AD led to a decrease in the production of ceramic goods in North Africa. Afterwards, lamp-making revived and accelerated. The introduction of fine local red-fired clays in the late 4th century AD triggered this revival. African Red Slip ware (ARS), or African Terra Sigillata, revolutionized the pottery and lamp-making industry.

ARS ware was produced from the last third of the 1st century AD onwards, and was of major importance in the mid-to-late Roman periods. Famous in antiquity as "fine" or high-quality tableware, it was distributed both regionally and throughout the Mediterranean basin along well-established and heavily trafficked trade routes. Northwest Africa's economy flourished as its products were dispersed and demand for its products dramatically increased.

Initially, the ARS lamp designs imitated the simple design of 3rd- to 4th-century coarseware lamps, often with globules on the shoulder or with fluted walls. More ornate designs appeared before the early 5th century as demand spurred on the creative process. The development and widespread distribution of ARS finewares marks the most distinctive phase of Northwest African pottery-making.

These characteristic pottery lamps were produced in large quantities by efficiently organized production centers with large-scale manufacturing abilities. They can be attributed to specific pottery-making centers in northern and central Tunisia by way of chemical analysis, allowing archeologists to trace distribution patterns from their source through the regions and across the Mediterranean. Some major ARS centers in central Tunisia are Sidi Marzouk Tounsi, Henchir el-Guellal (Djilma), and Henchir es-Srira, all of which have ARS lamp artifacts attributed to them by the microscopic chemical makeup of the clay fabric as well as macroscopic style prevalent in that region.

Regional pottery markets fueled the economy of both urban and rural sites and supported markets abroad. Certain vessel forms, fabrics, and decorative techniques like rouletting, appliqué, and stamped décor, are specific for a certain region and even for a certain pottery center. If neither form nor decoration of the material is identifiable, it is possible to trace an item using chemical analysis, not just to a certain region but even to its place of production by comparing its makeup to a matrix of important northeastern and central Tunisian potteries.

=== Forests, economy, and religion ===
Pine forests, with a herb layer of grasses, were widespread and economically significant, especially in the humid zone, the northeast of modern Tunisia (the areas known as the Tell and parts of the Dorsal mountains). Many areas are described as saltus, land used for non-agricultural exploitation. Timber, pitch (used to line amphorae and waterproof ships), firewood, pine nuts, and charcoal would all have been produced. Grazing was also practiced on forested land. Olive plantations were also widespread, usually on land previously forested, and the pomace residue after oil extraction was also locally important as fuel. The temple of Mercury Silvius, a god of commerce related to forests, in Dougga, and many lesser monuments elsewhere, are evidence of the importance of forests to local trade.

== See also ==
- List of Roman governors of Africa
- Ifriqiya
- African Romance
- Lex Manciana
- Fossatum Africae
- Roman limes
- Roman roads in Africa
- Kingdom of Africa
- Byzantine North Africa
