= Fossa Regia =

Roman ditch in the 2nd century BC

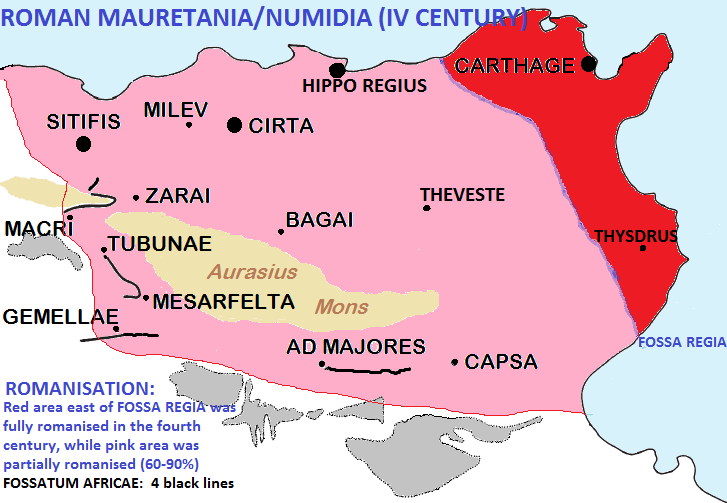
The Fossa Regia marked the border between the original Roman province of Africa and Numidia. East of Fossa Regia (area in red) there was full Latinisation

The Fossa Regia, also called the Fosse Scipio, was the first part of the Limes Africanus to be built in Roman Africa. It was used to divide the Berber kingdom of Numidia from the territory of Carthage that was conquered by the Romans in the second century BC.

It was an irregular ditch "from Thabraca on the northern coast to Thaenae on the south-eastern coast".

== History ==
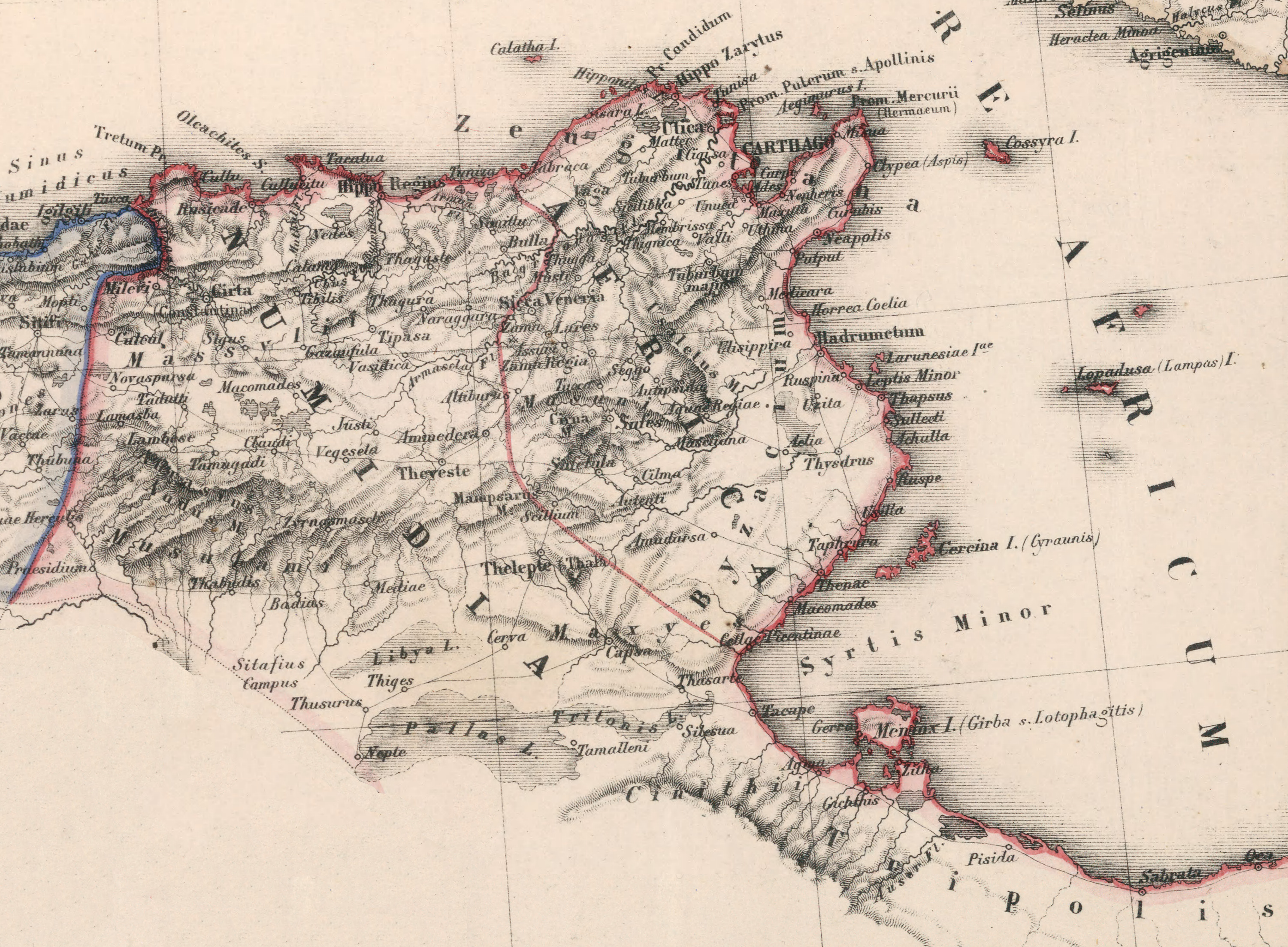
The Fossa regia marked approximately the border (in pink) between the province of Africa and Numidia

The Fossa was dug by the Romans after their final conquest of Carthage at the end of the Third Punic War in 146 BC. The construction's primary purpose was administrative, not military. It delineated the limits of the newly created Roman province of Africa marking the border between the Roman Republic and its then ally Numidia.

After the end of Caesar's Civil War in 46 BC, the western part of the Fossa regia served as the boundary between the province of Nova Africa, to its west, and the province of Africa Vetus to its east. Even after these two provinces were merged into Proconsular Africa in 27 BC, the ditch continued to be maintained as late as the year 74 AD under Vespasian as shown by many stone marker posts that have been found.

Ea pars quem Africam appellavimus dividitur in duas provincias, veterem ac novam, discretas fossa inter Africanum sequentem et reges Thenas usque perducta. — Plinius, Historia Naturalis, V, 25 (AD 77)

(The region that we call Africa is divided in two provinces, old and new, by a "fossa" (ditch) stretching in Africa from Thenas (near Sfax) to the Thabarca area).

East of Fossa regia there was full Latinization of the local society after Trajan. Under Theodosius that area was fully Romanized with one third of the population made of Italic colonists and their descendants, according to historian Theodore Mommsen. The other two thirds were Romanized Berbers, all Christians and nearly all Latin speaking.

== See also ==
- Fossatum Africae
- Limes Tripolitanus

== Bibliography ==
- G. Di Vita-Evrard: La Fossa Regia et les diocèses d'Afrique proconsulaire. In: A. Mastino (Hrsg.): L'Africa romana. Atti del III convegno di studio, 1986
- Mommsen, Theodore. The Provinces of the Roman Empire Section: Roman Africa. Ed. Barnes & Noble. New York, 2004
