= Clausurae =

Walls built to block narrow mountain passes

Clausurae (sing. clausura) are short, linear cut-off walls—a term modern scholars apply to masonry or earthen barriers erected across valleys, gorges or road corridors in Late Antiquity.

== Etymology and definition ==
The word derives from late-Latin clausura “a closing, barrier,” but philological studies have shown that in military contexts it denoted a discrete obstacle rather than a continuous frontier line. Because contemporary texts used the term variably—sometimes for a gate or fortified town—today’s historians reserve clausurae for short walls, normally a few hundred metres to several kilometres long, that seal natural bottlenecks.

== Historical context ==
An imperial rescript of 443 CE required the magister officiorum to report annually “on the state of the camps and of the clausurae along every frontier,” confirming their recognised role in the late-Roman defence-in-depth system. While earlier scholarship misread clausurae as grand linear ramparts, current consensus treats them instead as tactical choke-points manned by modest detachments and supported by nearby forts or watch-towers.

== Construction and typology ==
Most clausurae were stone walls 1–3 m thick and up to 5 m high, sometimes reinforced with towers and a frontal ditch; lighter barriers of timber and earth are also attested. Their alignments exploit steep valley flanks so that the artificial obstacle blocks the only practicable passage, minimising labour yet achieving effective control. Excavations along Alpine examples reveal coursed limestone facings with rubble cores, gates set between projecting bastions and evidence of hurried repairs during the fifth-century crises.

Landscape studies now integrate LiDAR and aerial photography to map previously unknown barriers, showing that Roman engineers chose locations primarily for traffic interception rather than maximal length or height.

== Geographic distribution ==
The best-studied concentration is the Claustra Alpium Iuliarum, a chain of walls, towers and forts stretching from the Karst Plateau to the Soča Valley that screened north-eastern Italy after c. 270 CE. North-African parallels include the 17 km Tebaga Gap wall in southern Tunisia, which blocked the main route between the Dahar uplands and the Gulf of Gabès.
