= Quintus Anicius Faustus =

Late 2nd / early 3rd century Roman military officer and senator

Quintus Anicius Faustus (fl. late 2nd century – early 3rd century AD) was a Roman military officer and senator who was appointed suffect consul in AD 198.

== Biography ==
Born either in Uzappa in the province of Numidia, or in Praeneste in Italia, it has been speculated that Anicius Faustus was possibly the son of a Sextus Anicius Saturninus and Seia Maxima. A member of the third century gens Anicia and a novus homo, Faustus was appointed the Legatus Augusti pro praetore (or imperial governor) of the province of Numidia by the emperor Septimius Severus, a position he held from AD 197 – 201. During this time he built several defensive forts of the Limes Tripolitanus, in southern Numidia and in Tripolitania, in order to protect the province from the raids of nomadic tribes.

Anicius Faustus was appointed consul suffectus in absentia in AD 198, while serving in Numidia. This was followed by his posting as Legatus Augusti pro praetore of Moesia Superior, which he may have held from possibly AD 202 to 205. He then fell out of favour with Septimius Severus, and this continued through Caracalla’s reign, possibly due to his close working relationship with Gaius Fulvius Plautianus, who was executed for plotting to overthrow the Severan Dynasty. It wasn't until the reign of Macrinus that he returned to favour, with his appointment as the proconsular governor of Asia, succeeding Gaius Julius Asper, a post which he held for two consecutive years, from AD 217 to 219. His prorogation was made at the expense of the distinguished Marcus Aufidius Fronto, whom Macrinus wanted to humiliate.

Anicius Faustus is speculated to have married either a Vesia Rustica or a Sergia Paulla, daughter of Lucius Sergius Paullus, consul ordinary 168. He probably had at least one son, Quintus Anicius Faustus Paulinus, who was a suffect consul sometime before AD 230.

== Sources ==
- Mennen, Inge, Power and Status in the Roman Empire, AD 193-284 (2011)
- Pat Southern, Roman Empire from Severus to Constantine, Routledge, 2001, ISBN 0-203-45159-7, pp. 45, 295.

== Notes ==
Political offices
Preceded by Publius Martius Sergius Saturninus, and Lucius Aurelius Gallus as Consules ordinarius	Suffect consul of the Roman Empire; 198 with ignotus	Succeeded by Publius Cornelius Anullinus II, and Marcus Aufidius Fronto as Consules ordinarius
