= Fossatum Africae =

Roman defensive line in northern Africa

- North Africa
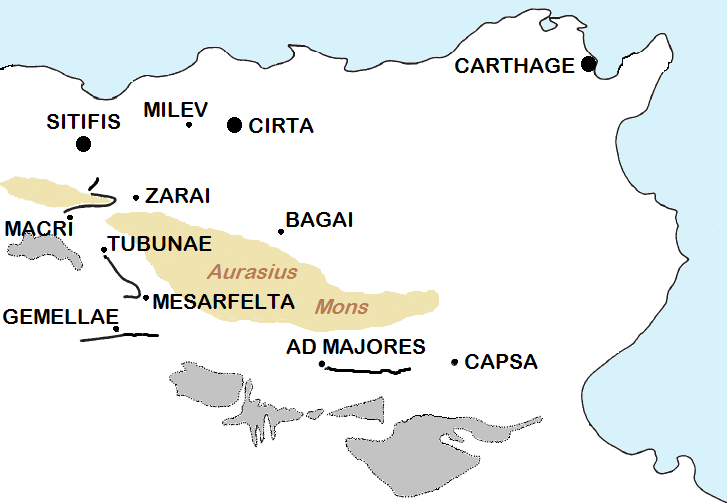
- Black lines indicate approximate path of the 4 sections of the Fossatum Africae according to Baradez (1949). See text below for details.

Site information
- Type: "Wall"
- Owner: Algeria, Tunisia
- Controlled by: Roman Empires

Site history
- Built: 122

Fossatum Africae ("African ditch") is one or more linear defensive structures (sometimes called limes) claimed to extend over 750 km (470 mi) or more in northern Africa constructed during the Roman Empire to defend and control the southern borders of the Empire in Africa. It is considered to be part of the greater frontier system in Roman Africa.

It is considered to have many similarities of construction to Hadrian's Wall, one of the northern borders of the Empire in Britain.

== History ==
The Fossa regia was the first frontier line to be built in Roman Africa, used to initially divide the Berber kingdom of Numidia from the territory of Carthage that was conquered by the Romans in the second century BC, but this is considered to be independent of the Fossatum Africae.

There is only a single mention of the Fossatum (as such) in historical literature prior to the 20th century. This occurs in a letter written by the co-emperors Honorius and Theodosius II to Gaudentius, the vicarius Africae, in 409, and preserved in the Codex Theodosianus. Noting that the fossatum had been established by the "ancients", the emperors warned the Roman citizens of Africa that if they did not maintain the limes and fossatum then the job (with associated land rights and other advantages) would be given to friendly barbarian tribes.

Consequently, it is not known with certainty when the Fossatum was constructed. Of course, a structure of this size would be the work of centuries, and the archaeological excavation of the many forts and towns along its route has yielded many dates from the reign of Hadrian in the 2nd century to Constantine in the 4th century. Current opinion has not advanced since the discussion by Baradez in 1949, who concluded that construction probably began after the first visit of Hadrian to Africa in 122 (and before or after his second visit in 128). This conclusion is based on the similarities with Hadrian's Wall in Britain and with what is known about Hadrian's concern to protect the Empire. Baradez also postulated a pulse of construction during the reign of Gordian III in the 3rd century, and finally abandonment of the Fossatum in 430–440 after the Vandal invasion.

Having been built in an arid region of strong winds and blowing sand, the Fossatum quickly eroded and only traces remain. During the Middle Ages, Arab nomads of the Banu Hilal occupied much of the area and noticed southwest of Biskra a ditch which they called a saqiya (irrigation canal) and attributed it to a legendary Arab queen Bint al-Khass (or al-Krass), who was supposed to have built it to supply pilgrims to Mecca with water. Elsewhere the remains of a wall associated with the Fossatum was attributed to al-Fara'un (Pharaoh).

Historians and archaeologists in the 19th century continued to believe that it was an irrigation canal, until at the beginning of the 20th century Gsell correctly identified it with the fossatum of the Codex Theodosianus.

However, the full extent of the Fossatum was not known until after World War II, when the use of aerial photography to locate archaeological sites was pursued by Col. Jean Baradez. He followed up the aerial work with traverses on the ground and excavations at many sites along its route. His resultant book, with many aerial and ground photographs, remains the standard work of reference.

Ideas on the purpose of the Fossatum have evolved since Baradez' time. Whereas Baradez was a military man, and World War II just having finished with the military use of ditches very much in mind, the military aspect of the Fossatum was emphasized. In the more peaceful modern era, the use of the Fossatum as a customs and migration control has been brought to the fore, suggested by inscriptions at Zaraï giving long lists of products and tariffs.

== Construction ==
The Fossatum as proposed by Baradez consisted of at least four segments:

- Hodna or Bou Taleb section: begins near the modern town of Ain Oulmene on the north-east slopes of the Hodna Mountains, heads south following the foothills then east towards Zaraï, then doubles back westward to enclose the eastern end of the Hodna mountains, standing between them and the Roman settlements of Cellas and Macri. The length of this segment is about 100 km (62 mi). It probably criss-crosses the border between Numidia and Mauretania Sitifensis.
- Tobna section: begins near Tubunae (modern Tobna), heads south-south-east to the gorge where the Oued Ksour emerges from the Awras Mountains (south of modern town of al-Kantara), south to the Roman town of Mesarfelta, then a short section west to enclose a northeast branch of the Zab Mountains. Length of this section is about 50 km (31 mi). The fossatum is associated with the Roman administrative border district known as the limes Tubunensis, but as it is up to 60 km (37 mi) away from the known border it cannot be said to actually mark the limes.
- Gemellae section: runs for about 60 km (37 mi) parallel to and 4–5 km (2.5–3.1 mi) south of the Wad Jadi, south and southwest of the Roman city of Vescera (modern Biskra); a major Roman military establishment (Gemellae) is at the center. The fossatum is close to, but slightly north of, the border in the Roman administrative district known as the limes Gemellensis. It marks the end of the irrigable area (with the Wad Jadi as source) and beginning of the Sahara desert.
- Ad Majores section: begins at Ad Majores (modern Besseriani) and runs eastwards for about 70 km (43 mi), following a range of hills, and almost reaching the modern village of Matlawi. The fossatum is associated with the Roman administrative border district known as the limes Montensis, but as it is 60 km (37 mi) or more away from the known border it cannot be said to actually mark the limes. However, a more recent examination has shown that the "fossatum" is probably a Roman road, not a ditch.

There may also be a further segment north of Tobna.

Generally the Fossatum consists of a ditch and earth embankments on either side using the material from the ditch. Sometimes the embankments are supplemented by dry stone walls on one or both sides; rarely, there are stone walls without a ditch. The width of the Fossatum is generally 3–6 m (9.8–19.7 ft) but in exceptional cases may be as much as 20 m (66 ft). Wherever possible, it or its highest wall is constructed on the counterscarp. Excavations near Gemellae showed the depth there to be 2–3 m (6 ft 7 in – 9 ft 10 in), with a width of 1 m (3 ft 3 in) at the bottom widening to 2–3 m (6 ft 7 in – 9 ft 10 in) at the top.

The Fossatum is accompanied by many small watchtowers and numerous forts, often built within sight of one another.

There are similar, but shorter, fossata in other parts of North Africa. Between the Matmata and Tabaga ranges in modern Tunisia there is a fossatum which was duplicated during World War II. There also appears to be a 20 km (12 mi) fossatum at Bou Regreg in Morocco although this would not have been within the scope of the proclamation of the Codex Theodosianus because at that time the province was not in Africa, administratively speaking.

== See also ==
- Limes Tripolitanus
- Limes Mauretaniae

== Bibliography ==
- Baradez, J (1949). Fossatum Africae. Recherches Aériennes sur l'organisation des confins Sahariens a l'Epoque Romaine. Arts et Métiers Graphiques, Paris.
- Basset, R. (1905). "La légende de Bent el Khass", Revue Africaine v. 49 p. 18-34.
- Gsell, S. (1903). "Le Fossé des Frontières romaines dans l'Afrique du Nord." Mélanges Boissier, pp. 227–234.
- Trousset, P. (1980) "Les milliaires de Chebika (Sud tunisien)." Antiquités africaines, v. 15 pp. 135–154.
- Trousset, P. (2009). "Pénétration romaine et organisation de la zone frontière dans le prédésert tunisien" in: L’Africa romana. Ai confini dell’Impero: contatti, scambi conflitti. Atti del XV convegno di studio. Tozeur, 11–15 dicembre 2002. Carocci, Rome, pp. 59–88.
