= Limes Tripolitanus =

Roman frontier defence line

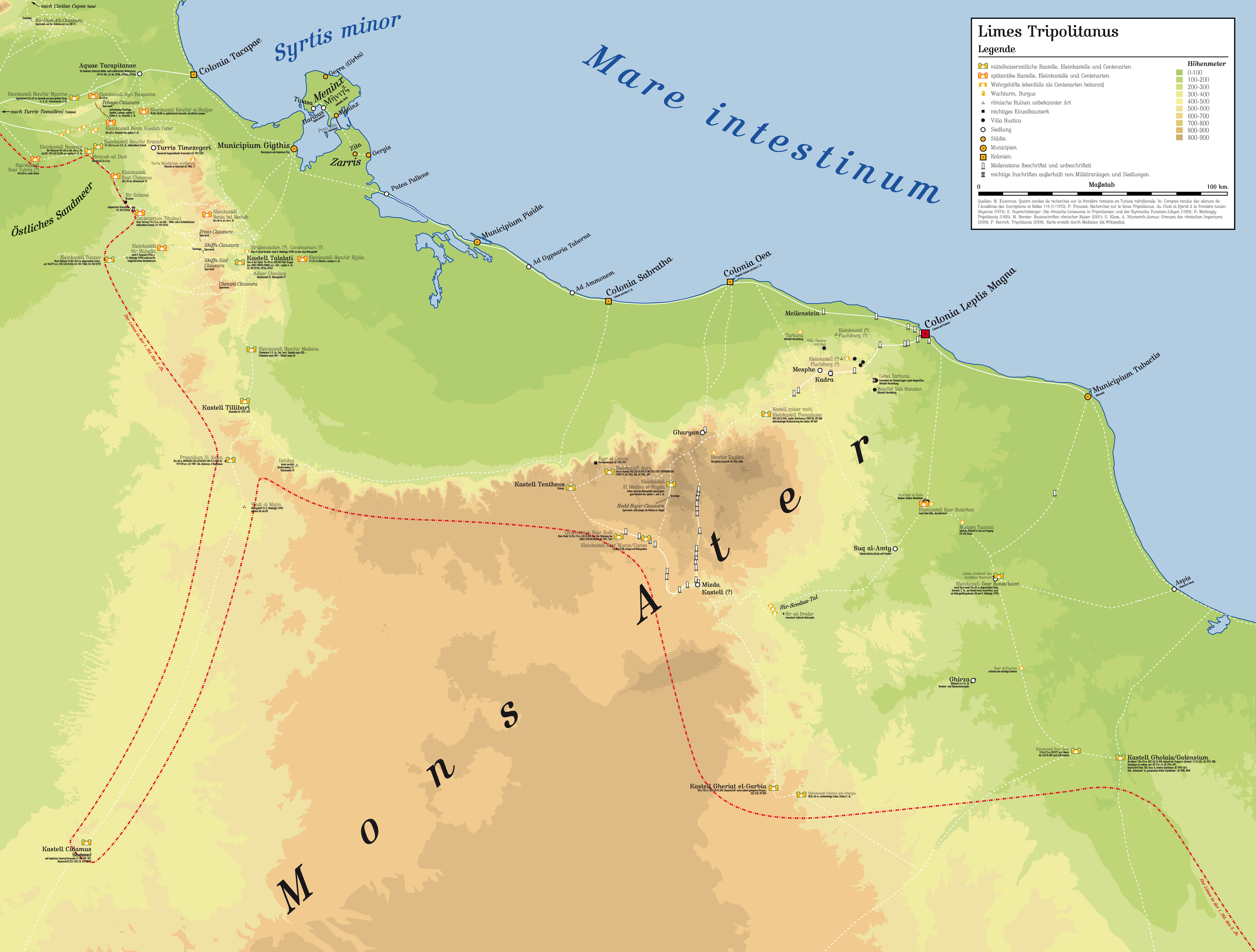
Map of the Limes Tripolitanus.

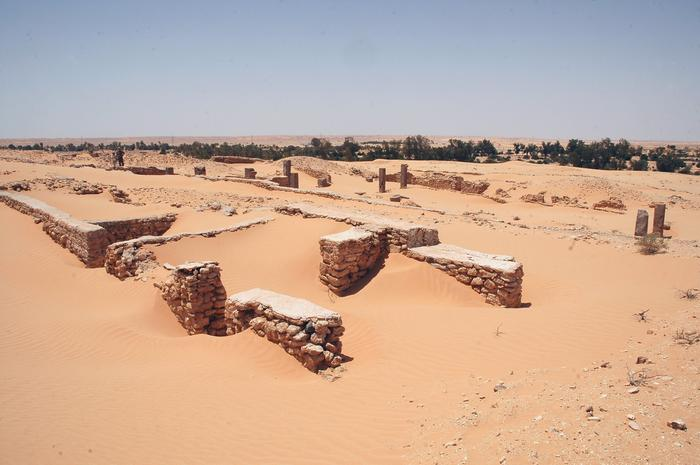
Remains of the Roman castrum of Golaia (currently Bu Njem) in the Limes Tripolitanus.

The Limes Tripolitanus was a frontier zone of defence of the Roman Empire, built in the south of what is now Tunisia and the northwest of Libya. It was primarily intended as a protection for the tripolitanian cities of Leptis Magna, Sabratha and Oea in Roman Libya.

== History ==
The earliest records of the Limes Tripolitanus date to after the reign of Emperor Augustus in the first century AD. Similar to other Roman border infrastructure, the fortifications enabled the growing state to exert greater control in its varied interactions with tribes such as the Garamantes. In 50 AD, a several-month-long military expedition was launched by Septimius Flaccus and Julius Maternus into the Fezzan and potentially further south.

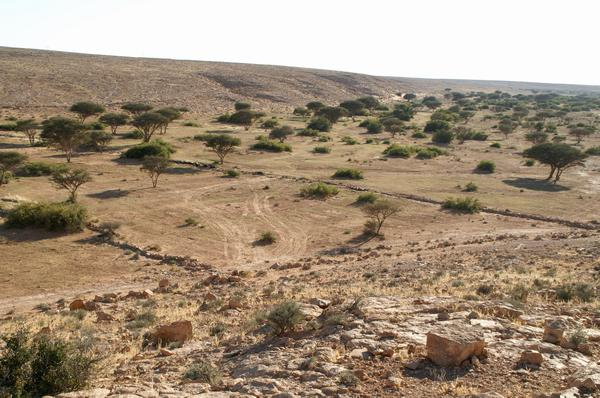
Remnants of "Centenaria" at Suq al-Awty.

The Romans did not conquer the Garamantes so much as they seduced them with the benefits of trade and discouraged them with the threat of war. The last Garamantian foray to the coast was in AD 69, when they joined with the people of Oea (modern Tripoli) in battle against Leptis Magna.

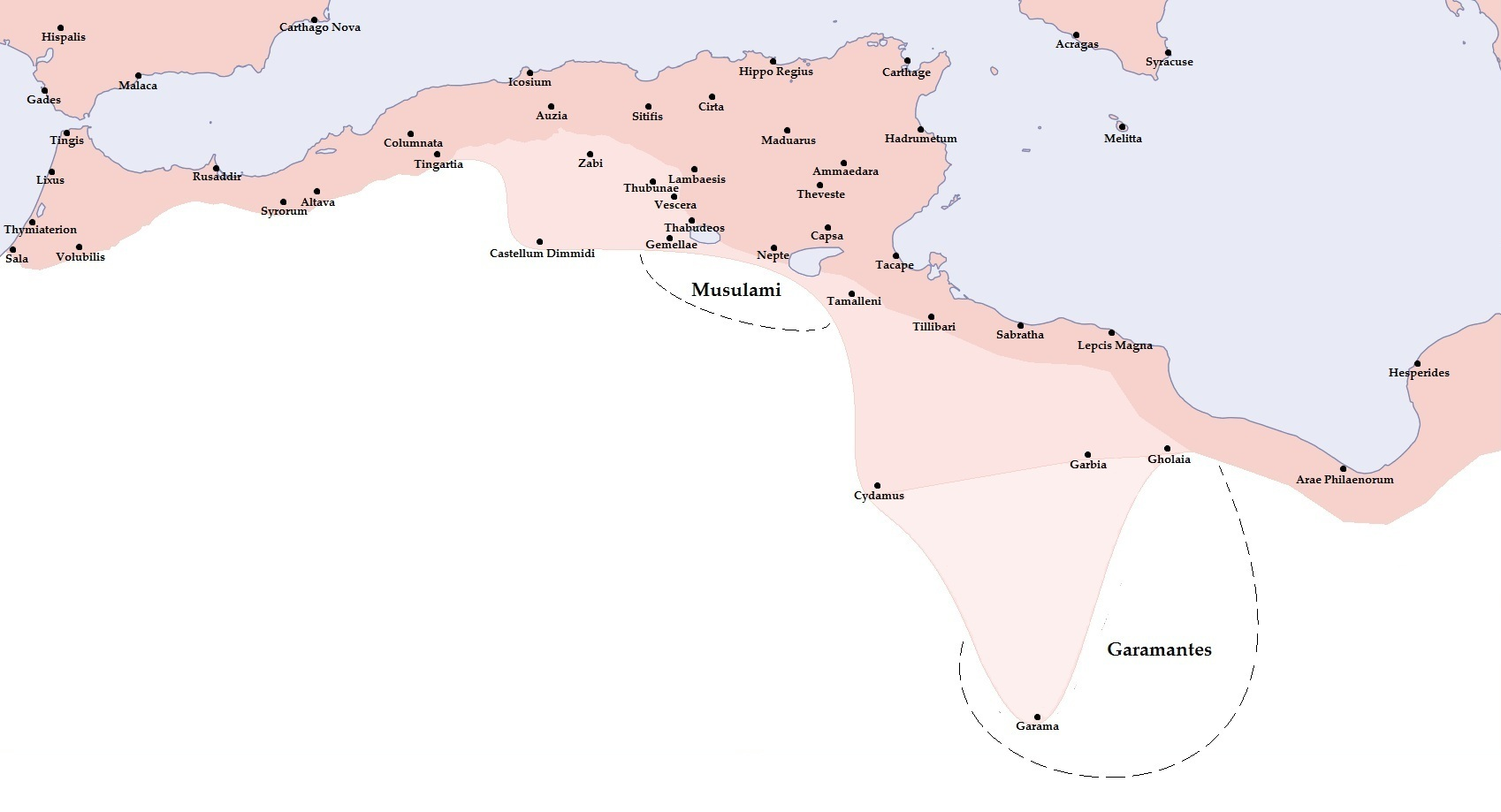
Faustus' campaigning between 197 and 202 AD greatly contributed to the expansion of the Limes Tripolitanus between Nepte and Golaia

The Romans, in order to defend the main Roman cities of Tripolitania (Oea, Sabratha and Leptis Magna), intervened and marched south. According to Edward Bovill, author of the book The Golden Trade of the Moors, this campaign marked the Romans’ first use of camels in the Sahara, which convinced the Garamantes that their advantage in desert warfare no longer held.

After that the Garamantes started to become a client state of the Roman Empire, but nomads always endangered the fertile area of coastal Tripolitania. Because of this Romans created the Limes Tripolitanus

The first fort on the limes was built at Thiges, to protect from nomad attacks in 75 AD. The limes was expanded under emperors Hadrian and Septimius Severus, in particular under the legatus Quintus Anicius Faustus in 197-201 AD.

Indeed, Anicius Faustus was appointed legatus of the Legio III Augusta and built several defensive forts of the Limes Tripolitanus in Tripolitania, among which Garbia and Golaia (actual Bu Ngem) in order to protect the province from the raids of nomadic tribes. He fulfilled his task quickly and successfully.

As a consequence the Roman city of Gaerisa (actual Ghirza), situated away from the coast and south of Leptis Magna, developed quickly in a rich agricultural area Ghirza became a "boom town" after 200 AD, when the Roman emperor Septimius Severus (born in Leptis Magna) had organized the Limes Tripolitanus.

Former soldiers were settled in this area, and the arid land was developed. Dams and cisterns were built in the Wadi Ghirza (then not dry like today) to regulate the flash floods. These structures are still visible: there is among the ruins of Gaerisa a temple, which may have been dedicated to the Berber semi-god "Gurzil", and the name of the town itself may even be related to his name. The farmers produced cereals, figs, vines, olives, pulses, almonds, dates, and perhaps melons. Ghirza consisted of some forty buildings, including six fortified farms (Centenaria), two of which were quite large. It was abandoned in the Middle Ages.

With Diocletian the limes was partially abandoned and the defence of the area was delegated to the Limitanei. The Limes survived as an effective protection until Byzantine times (Emperor Justinian restructured the Limes in 533 AD).

Nomad warriors of the Banu Hillal tribe captured the centenaria/castra of the Limes in the 11th century and the agricultural production fell to nearly nothing within a few decades: even Leptis Magna and Sabratha were abandoned and only Oea survived, which was from now on known as Tripoli.

== Current situation ==
In Libya today, very substantial remains survive, e.g., the limes castles at Abu Nujaym (ancient Golaia) and Al Qaryah al Gharbīyah, the frontier village Gaerisa, and about 2,000 fortified farms (Centenaria) like Qaryat.

Tunisia has several sites attached to the limes. In 2012, some of these sites were presented to UNESCO in order to register them as World Heritage.

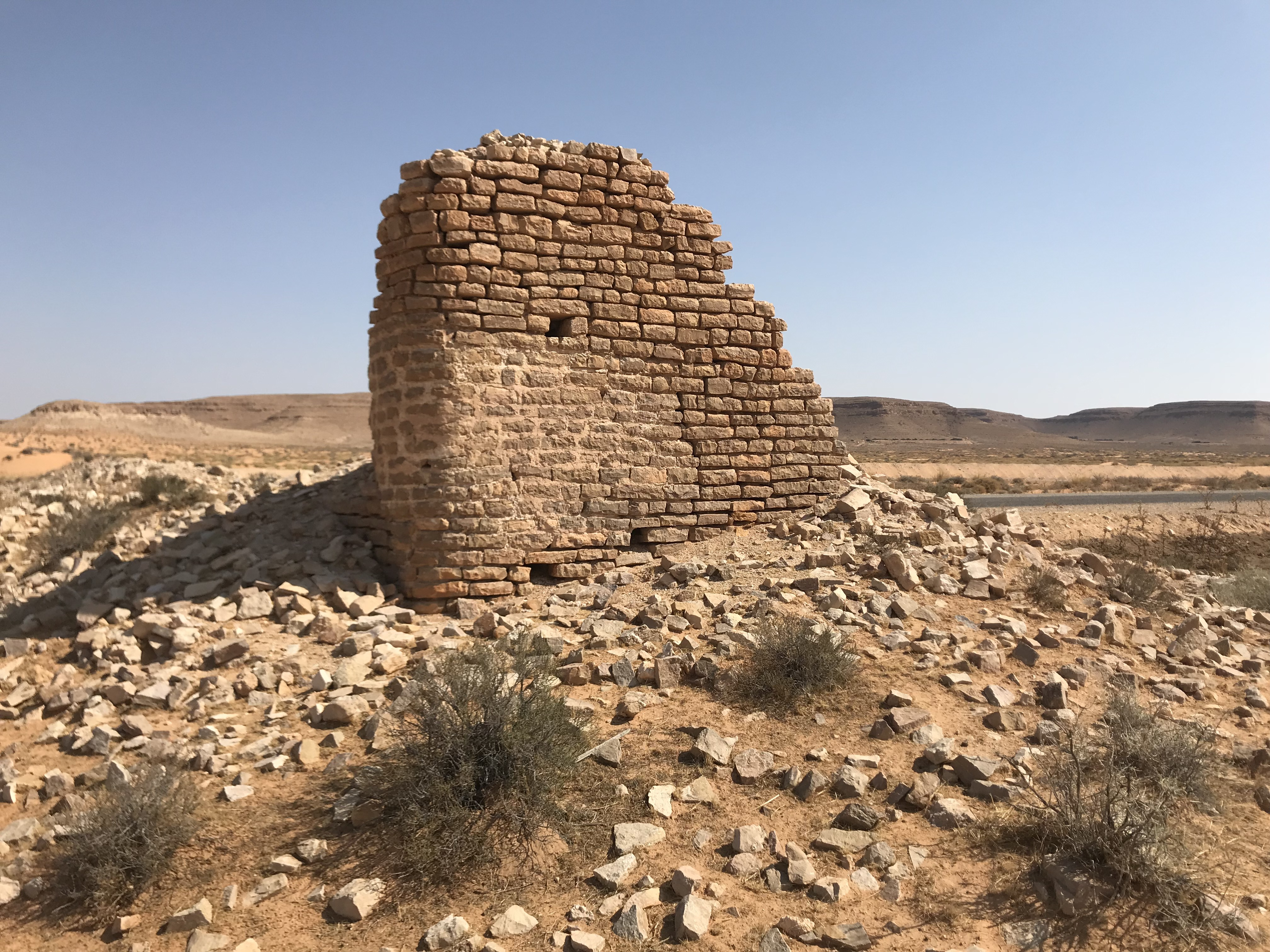
The south gate tower of the clausura at Wadi Skiffa (Tataouine Governorate).

=== Tebaga Clausura ===
The Tebaga Wall is a 17 kilometers-long fortification line built along the Tebaga Gap or Clausura between the range of Jebel Tebaga and the hills of the Matma Mountains.

=== Forts (castrum) ===
- Ghadames (30°08′30.0″N 9°30′30.0″E)
- Mizda (31°25′36″N 12°58′36″E)
- Bani Waled (31°45′29″N 13°59′32″E)
- Abu Nujaym (30°34′42.75″N 15°24′48.66″E)
- Qaryat (30°23′29″N 13°35′25″E)

== See also ==
- Fossatum Africae
- Limes Mauretaniae
- Centenarium
- Roman Libya
- Roman expeditions to Sub-Saharan Africa
- Roman baths of Gafsa

== Sources ==
- Bacchielli, L. "La Tripolitania" in Storia Einaudi dei Greci e dei Romani (Geografia del mondo tardo-antico). Einaudi, Milan, 2008.
- Graeme Barker e.a., Farming the desert. The UNESCO Libyan Valleys Archaeological Survey (1996 Paris and Tripoli)
- Margot Klee, Grenzen des Imperiums. Leben am römischen Limes (2006 Stuttgart)
- Jona Lendering, 'Sherds from the Desert. The Bu Njem Ostraca' in: Ancient Warfare 1/2 (2007)
- David Mattingly, Roman Tripolitania (1995 London)
- Erwin Ruprechtsberger, Die römische Limeszone in Tripolitanien und der Kyrenaika, Tunesien - Libyen (1993 Aalen)
