= Exilissa =

Ancient settlement in Mauretania

- Type: Settlement
- Location: Morocco
- Region: Mauretania Tingitana

History
- Built: two centuries BC (after 40 BC colonised by Romans)
- Built by: Phoenicians/Romans
- Abandoned: 640 AD (disappeared 1 century later)

Site notes
- Condition: a few ruins

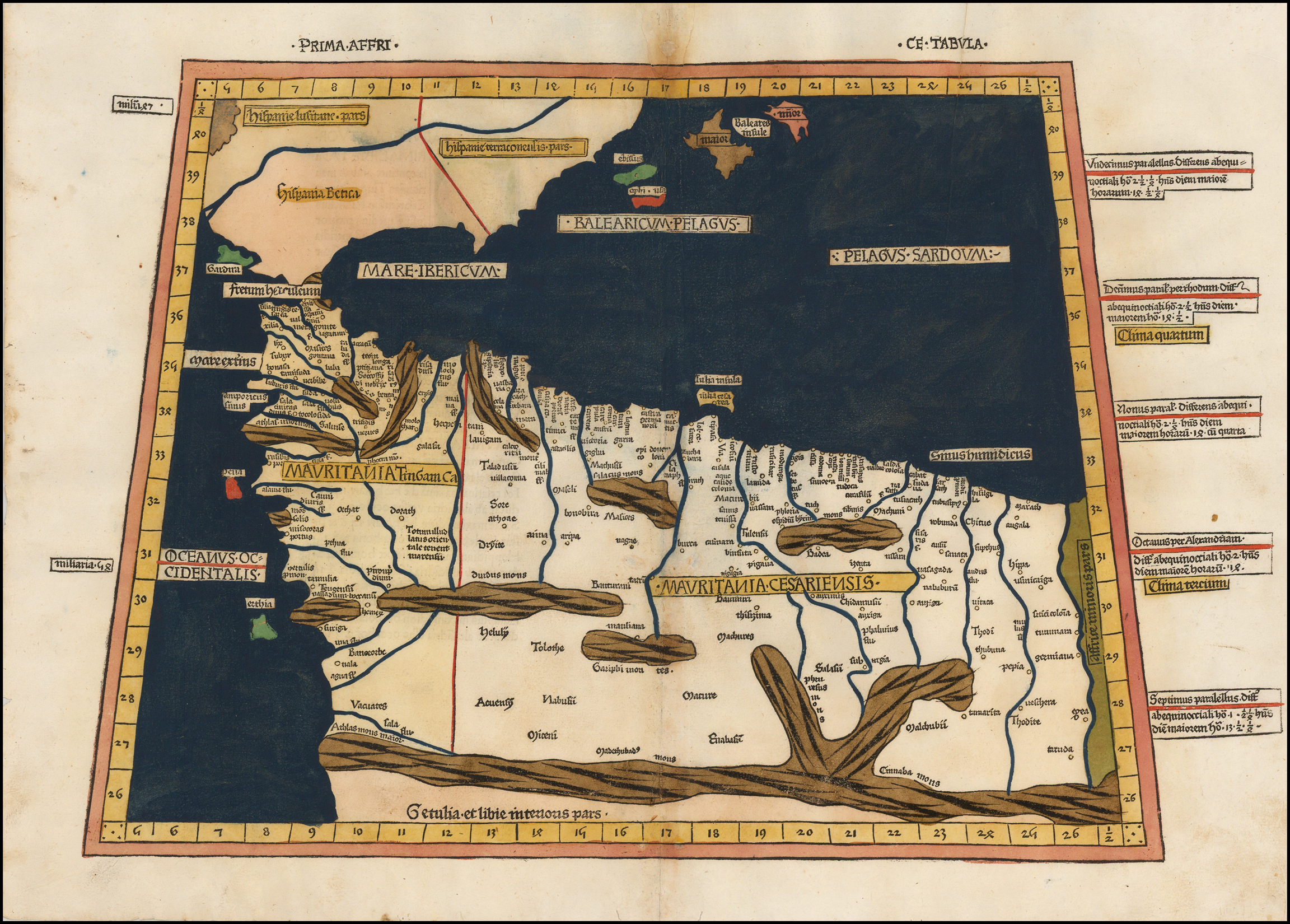
Prima Affrice Tabula depicting Mauretania

Exilissa was an ancient city in northern Mauretania (in modern-day Morocco), facing the strait of Gibraltar and next to the Roman Septem (actual Ceuta).

== History ==
In antiquity, it was known by the names Lissa to Pliny the Elder and Exilissa (Ancient Greek: Ἐξίλισσα) as mentioned by Ptolemy. Pliny stated that it no longer existed at his time. Lipiński conjectured that it represented the survival of the Phoenician settlement's name Ḥiq or Ḥeq-še-Elišša ("Bay of Elissa"). Note, however, that Pliny and Lipiński place the ancient settlement further east, closer to Benzú. The Byzantine Greek name was Exilýssa (Εξιλύσσα).

In ancient times this site was perhaps occupied by a Phoenician factory.

Exilissa grew in importance during the centuries of the Roman Empire. Under Trajan and Hadrian reached top population when had nearly 10000 inhabitants, many descendants of Roman colonists settled there under Augustus.

In Roman times, the city and gardens of modern Bel Younech were called Exilissa. Travelers described monkeys roaming its hills like they do now in Morocco's Azrou near the Ifrane National Park

Under the Romans, it was an important salting post. It would've been overrun by the Vandals in the 5th century and then reconquered by the Byzantines in the 6th.

Exilissa was an important christian center when was conquered by the Arabs in 640 AD.

With the Arab conquest of all Maghreb the city started to lose importance: Exilissa disappeared in the 9th century.

Ksar Mesmouda (actual Ksar es-Seghir) was established there, one century after the Umayyad conquest of the area in 708-709 AD.

== See also ==
- Septem
- Tingis
- Mauretania Tingitana

== Sources ==
- Lipiński, Edward (2004), Itineraria Phoenicia, Orientalia Lovaniensia Analecta, No. 127, Studia Phoenicia, Vol. XVIII, Leuven: Uitgeverij Peeters, ISBN 9789042913448.
