= Tingi =

Ancient city in modern day Tangier, Morocco

Coordinates: 35°47′N 5°49′W

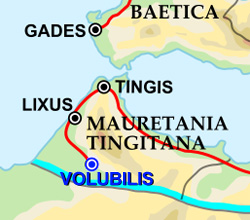
Location of Tingis in Roman Mauretania Tingitana

Tingis was the ancient name of Tangier in Morocco and an important Carthaginian, Mauretanian, and Roman port on the Atlantic Ocean. It was eventually granted the status of a Roman colony and made the capital of the province of Mauretania Tingitana and, after Diocletian's reforms, the diocese of Hispania.

== Legends ==
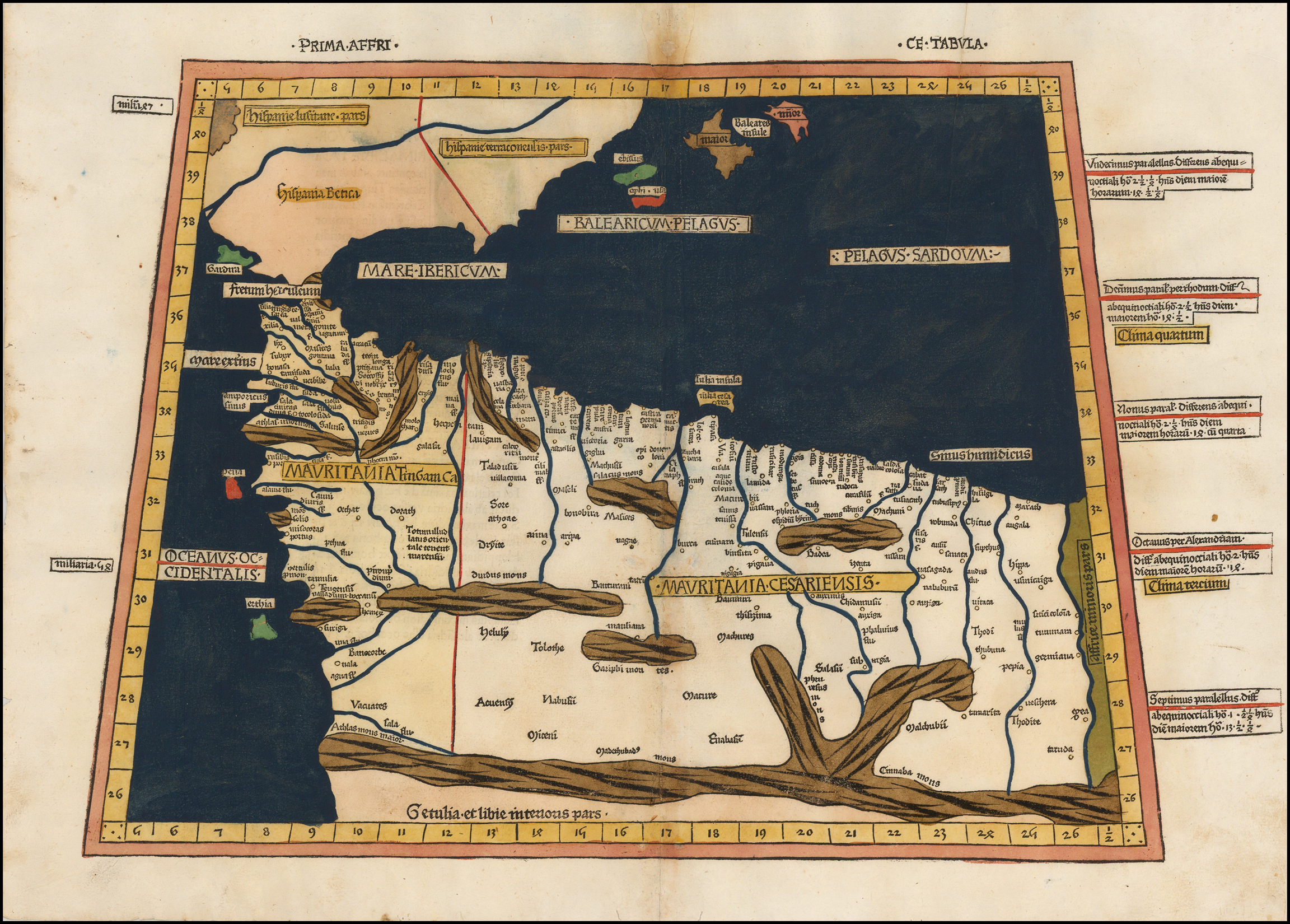
Ptolemy's 1st African map, showing Roman Mauretania Tingitana

The Greeks claimed that Tingis had been named for a daughter of the titan Atlas, who was supposed to support the vault of heaven nearby. They claimed that the Berber legends comported with the stories of Hercules's labors, which carried him to North Africa and the North Atlantic to retrieve the golden apples of the Hesperides. Having killed her husband Antaeus and again condemned her father to eternally supporting the firmament, Hercules slept with Tinja and fathered the Berber hero Syphax. Syphax supposedly founded the port of Tingis and named it his mother's honor after her death. The gigantic skeleton and tomb of Antaeus were tourist attractions for ancient visitors. The Caves of Hercules, where he supposedly rested on Cape Spartel, remain one today.

== History ==
=== Phoenician port ===
A settlement in Tingis began, at the earliest, in the 10th century BC by Phoenecians, before being settled around the beginning of the 6th century BC by Carthaginian colonists, who variously recorded the name of their settlement as TNG (Punic: 𐤕𐤍𐤂), TNGʾ (𐤕𐤍𐤂𐤀), and TYNGʾ (𐤕𐤉𐤍𐤂𐤀). The town is sometimes connected to the voyages of Hanno the Navigator.

=== Mauretanian city ===
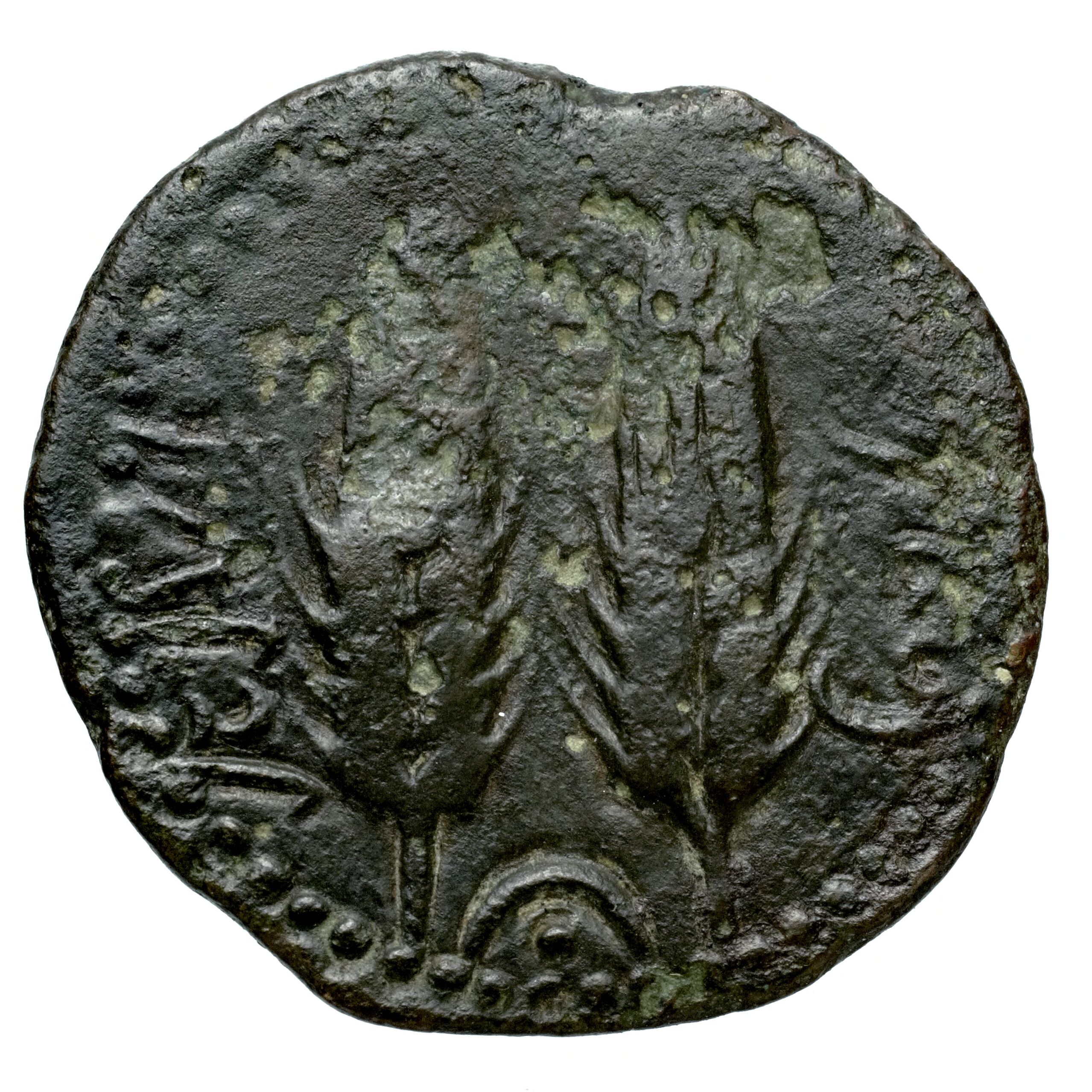
A coin of Tingi with a Punic legend

After the Punic Wars, Carthage lost control of the colony to the Roman-allied kings of Mauretania. Its name during this time appears in Greek and Roman sources variously as Tenga, Tinga, Titga, &c. It maintained strong ties to its Carthaginian heritage, issuing bronze coins with Punic legends reading "City of Titga" (𐤁𐤏𐤋𐤕 𐤕𐤕𐤂𐤀, BʿLT TTGʾ), "City of Tinga" (𐤁𐤏𐤋𐤕 𐤕𐤉𐤍𐤂𐤀, BʿLT TYNGʾ), or "people of Tinga" (𐤌𐤁𐤏𐤋 𐤕𐤉𐤍𐤂𐤀, MBʿL TYNGʾ). These bore Baal or (via interpretatio Graeca) Demeter's head obverse and wheat reverse.

=== Roman provincial capital ===
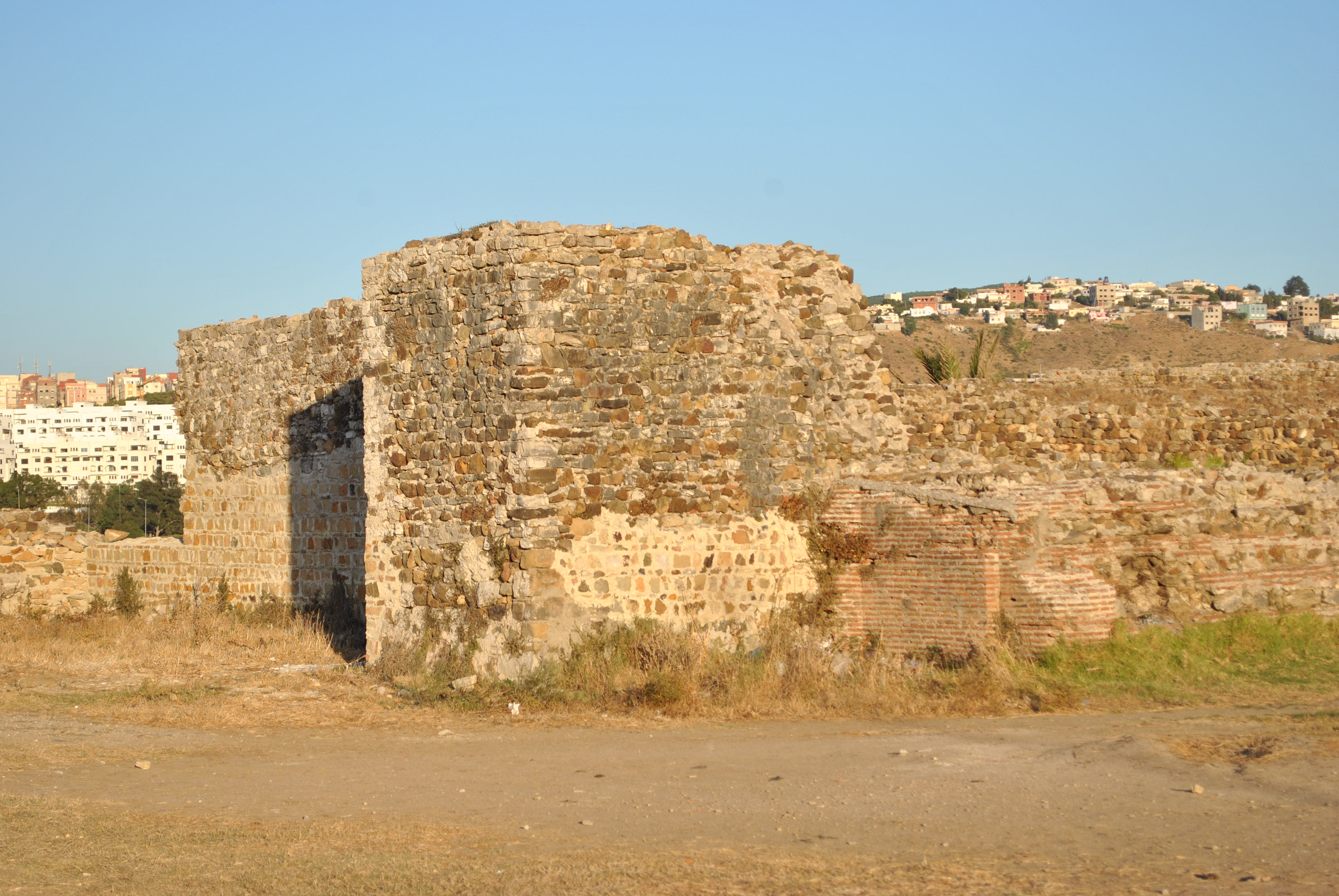
Surviving walls from Roman Tingis

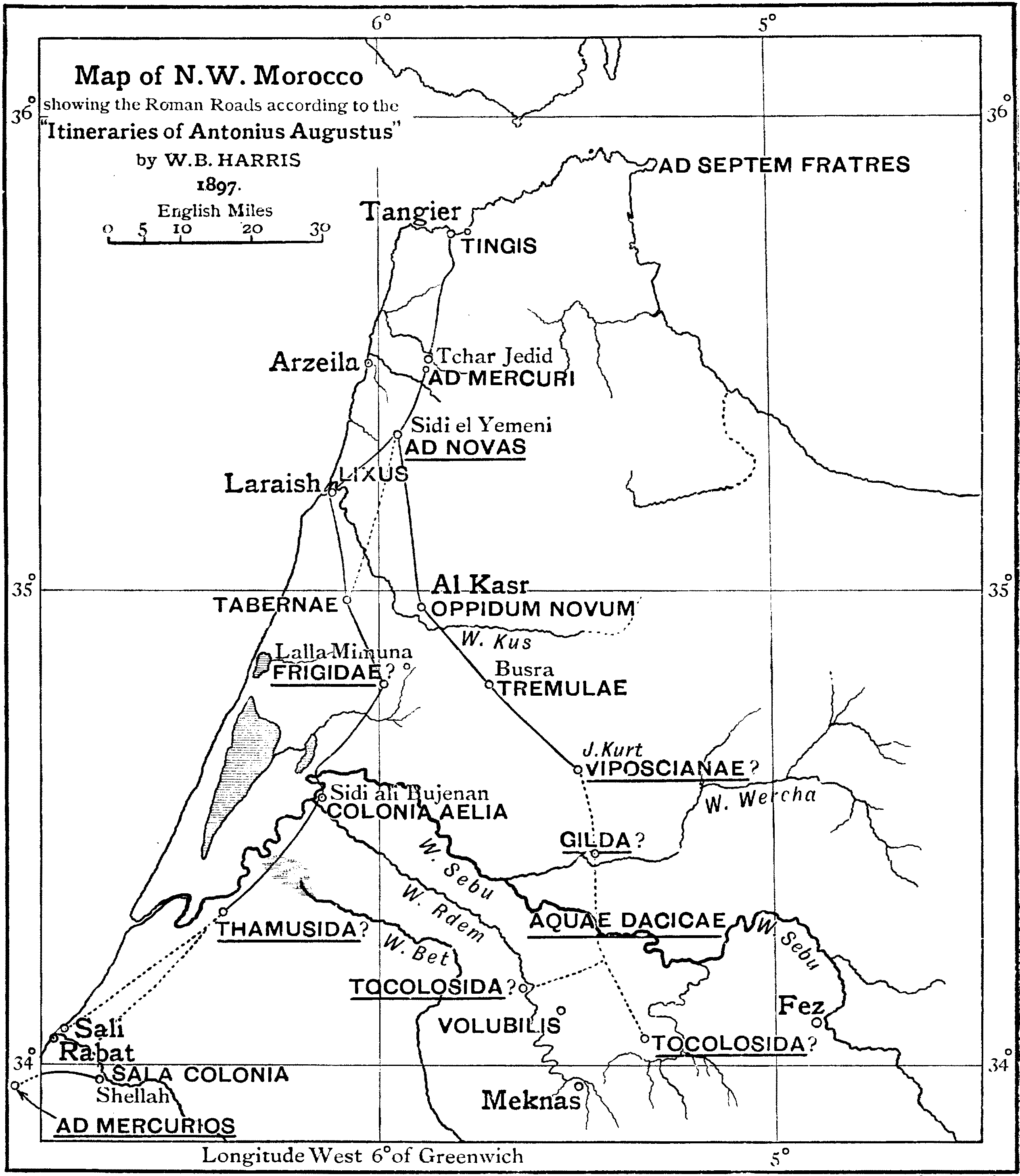
Roman roads in Morocco

The town came under Roman rule in the 1st century BC. Q. Sertorius, took and held Tingis for a number of years in the 70s BC as part of his war against Sulla's regime in Rome. Tingis grew in importance as a free city under Augustus and then as a colony under Claudius, who made it the capital of Mauritania Tingitana. As a Roman colony, it bore the formal name Colonia Iulia Tingi, the "Julian colony of Tingis". Under the early empire, it began to use Latin script, issuing its bronze coins with the legend IVL TIN; these bore Augustus and Agrippa's heads obverse and Baal's head reverse.

Called Colonia Iulia Tingi on its coins, governed most likely under Latin law and at first attached administratively to Spain, it became under Claudius a Roman colony and chief city of the province of Mauretania Tingitana after it was set up. In 297 the city probably served Maximianus as a base during his campaign against the Moorish rebels, and it was very likely about this time that the Christians Marcellus and Cassienus were put to death. The former belonged to a Spanish community, the latter, however, probably to a local church which funerary inscriptions show existed in the 4th-5th c. although there is no mention of a bishopric until the 6th c. The limits of the ancient settlement are clearly marked by the necropolis discovered to the northwest (that of Marshan and Avenue Cenario), to the west (Mendoubia) and south (Bou Kachkach). Nothing remains of the substructures, which could still be seen on the seashore at the beginning of the century. There were also some baths underneath the Casbah, and confused remains of a monument—apparently a Christian basilica—have been uncovered in the Rue de Belgique. So far as the rest of the city is concerned one can only presume that the forum was situated on the site of the Petit Socco and what was perhaps a temple on the site of the Great Mosque, and that the decumanus maximus corresponded roughly to the Zenga Es Siaghine. Among the few antiquities that have been discovered, the only noteworthy finds, aside from inscriptions and a few mosaic fragments, are a statue of a woman of indifferent workmanship and a mutilated head of the emperor Galba.

As a provincial capital, Tingis developed and prospered. In the 4th century, it surpassed Volubilis when that city was left south of the Roman lines and unprotected by Roman legions. Tingis at its peak reached 20,000 inhabitants, all thoroughly romanized and mostly Christian. Tingis was famed throughout the Roman Empire for its fishing conserve industry. Under Septimius Severus, two Roman roads were constructed from Tingis: one on the Atlantic coast to Sala Colonia and the second into the mountainous interior toward Volubilis.

During Diocletian's reform of Roman governmental structures in AD 296, Mauretania Tingitana became part of the Diocese of Hispania. Tingis remained the capital of the larger territory, maintaining its status and development.

=== Later history ===
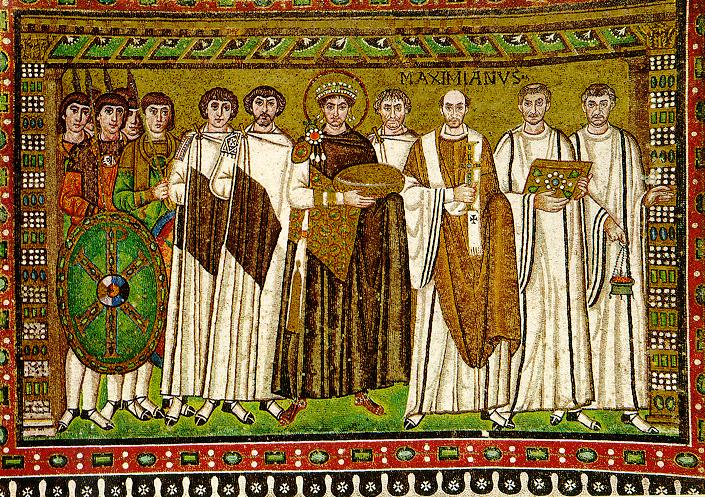
Justinian and his general Belisarius, as depicted in Ravenna.

The Vandals conquered and occupied Tingis around AD 425 before sweeping across the Roman Maghreb.

Between 534 and 682, Tingis was restored to Byzantine control. Tingis was fortified and a new church erected. However, its commercial strength had waned, a change attested by its decreased issuance of coins.

Tingis fell under the control of the Umayyad Caliphate as part of the Muslim conquest of North Africa in 702, after which it was reduced to a small town more commonly discussed under the name Tangier. Tariq ibn Ziyad organized the conquest of Spain from Tingis and nearby Septem in 706.

== Religion ==
The Christian history of Tingis started during the second half of the first century, under Claudius's rule. Originally, the city was part of the larger province of Mauretania Caesariensis, which included most of the Roman Maghreb. Later the area was subdivided, with the eastern part keeping the former name and the newer part receiving the name of Mauretania Tingitana. It is not known exactly at what period there may have been an episcopal see at Tangier in ancient times, but in the late Middle Ages Tangier was a titular see (i.e., an honorific fiction for the appointment of curial and auxiliary bishops). For the historical reasons given above, one official list of the Roman Curia places the see in Mauretania Caesariensis.

Towards the end of the third century, Tingis was the scene of the martyrdom of St Marcellus, mentioned in the Roman Martyrology on 30 October, and of St. Cassian, mentioned on 3 December. Indeed, according to tradition, the martyrdom of St Marcellus took place on 28 July 298.

A small Christian community survived in Tangier as late as the 10th century. Due to its Christian past, Tangier—under the name Tingis—is still a titular see of the Roman Catholic Church.

== See also ==
- Mauretania Tingitana
- Sala Colonia
- Saints Cassian and Marcellus of Tingis
- Roman Empire
