= Marcellus of Tangier =

Catholic saint

Saint Marcellus of Tangier
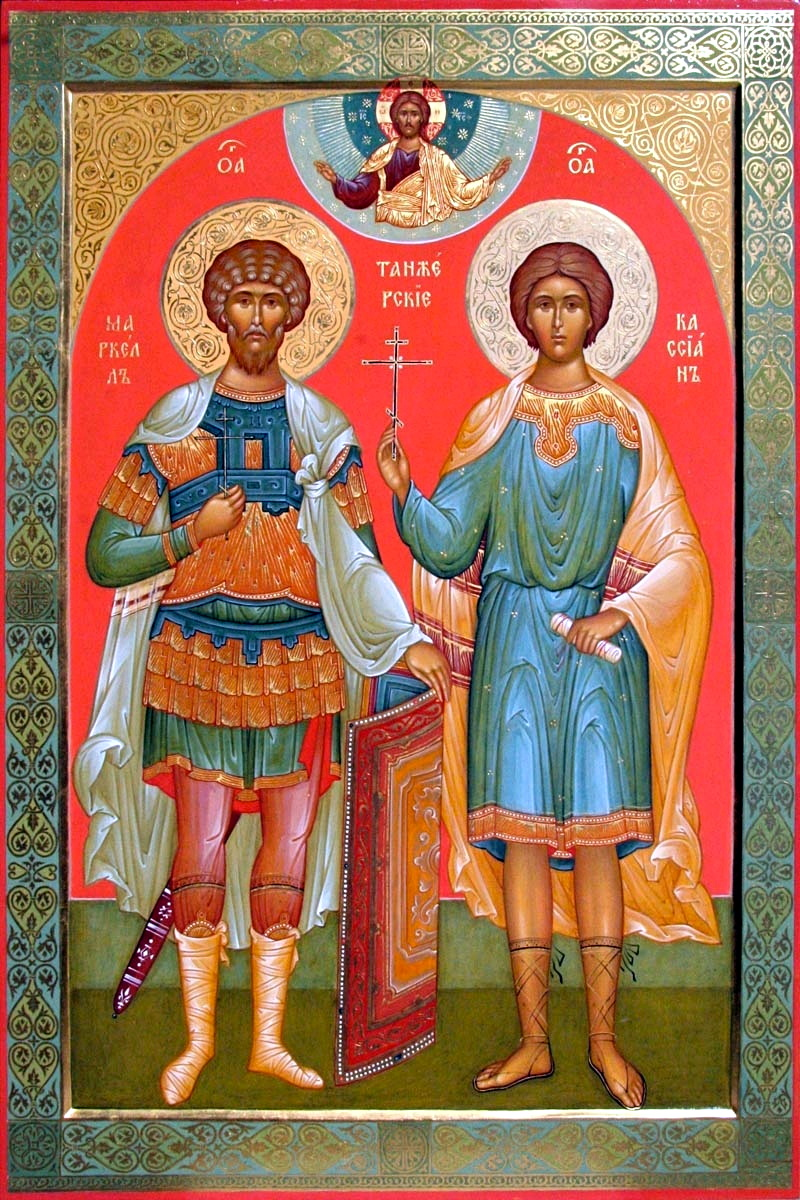
- Icon of Saint Marcellus located in the Russian Orthodox Church of the Resurrection, Rabat

Martyr
- Born: c. mid 3rd century AD
- Died: 298 AD; Tingis, Mauretania Tingitana (modern-day Tangiers, Morocco)
- Venerated in: Catholic Church, Eastern Orthodox Church
- Canonized: Pre-Congregation
- Major shrine: Church of San Marcelo, León
- Feast: October 30
- Patronage: the city of León and the Province of León, Spain

Saint Marcellus of Tangier or Saint Marcellus the Centurion (Spanish: San Marcelo) (c. mid 3rd century – 298 AD) was a Roman centurion who is today venerated as a martyr-saint in both the Eastern Orthodox and the Catholic Church. His feast day is celebrated on October 30.

== Life ==
Marcellus is said to have been a Roman centurion, stationed at Tingis (modern-day Tangiers), who refused to participate in the general birthday celebrations of the Emperor Maximian, which would have entailed sacrifice to the Roman gods. Throwing off his military belt, weapons, and vine staff (the symbol of his rank), Marcellus was soon brought before a judge named Fortunatus. The judge remanded the saint to lay his case before Maximian and Constantius; the latter was friendly to Christians. However, Marcellus was taken to the deputy Praetorian prefect Aurelius Agricolanus instead. Marcellus pled guilty to repudiating his allegiance to an earthly leader.

Marcellus was martyred with a sword by the deputy Praetorian prefect.

Afterwards, it is said that the official shorthand writer, a man named Saint Cassian, was so angry at the sentence that he refused to record the court proceedings and was martyred as well.

St. Marcellus's relics were later brought to and enshrined at what now is León, Spain, and he became a patron saint of the city. The Plaza de San Marcelo in this city is named for him. The church of San Marcelo dates from the 10th century.

== Alternative version ==
An alternative version of his legend states that he was a centurion of the Legio VII Gemina Pia Felix, and was born in what is now León, Spain, in the middle of the third century. This version, however, has been shown to be largely apocryphal. (Note: The oldest versions of the documents relating to Saint Marcelleus lack any reference to either Léon or the legio septima gemina. They do not belong to the original. see: Noé Villaverde Vega, Tingitana en la antigüedad tardía, siglos III–VII, p. 341) The story relates that Marcellus lived close to the city walls. During the birthday celebrations for the Emperor Maximian, in July 298, Marcellus publicly demonstrated his Christian faith by throwing down the insignia of his rank, and proclaimed that he venerated only one God. He was then sent to Tangiers to be judged by the vice-prefect (vicar), Agricolanus. He was condemned to death and decapitated on October 29, 298, together with his wife Nona and his twelve sons (Claudius, Lupercus, Victorius, Facundus, Primitivus, Servandus, Germanus, Faustus, Januarius, and Martial). Included in this group of sons are the martyrs Emeterius and Celedonius, though their connection to Marcellus is probably apocryphal. Servandus and Germanus (or Cermanus) were venerated separately at Cádiz, and their association with Marcellus is also apocryphal.

== Claudius, Lupercus, Victorius ==
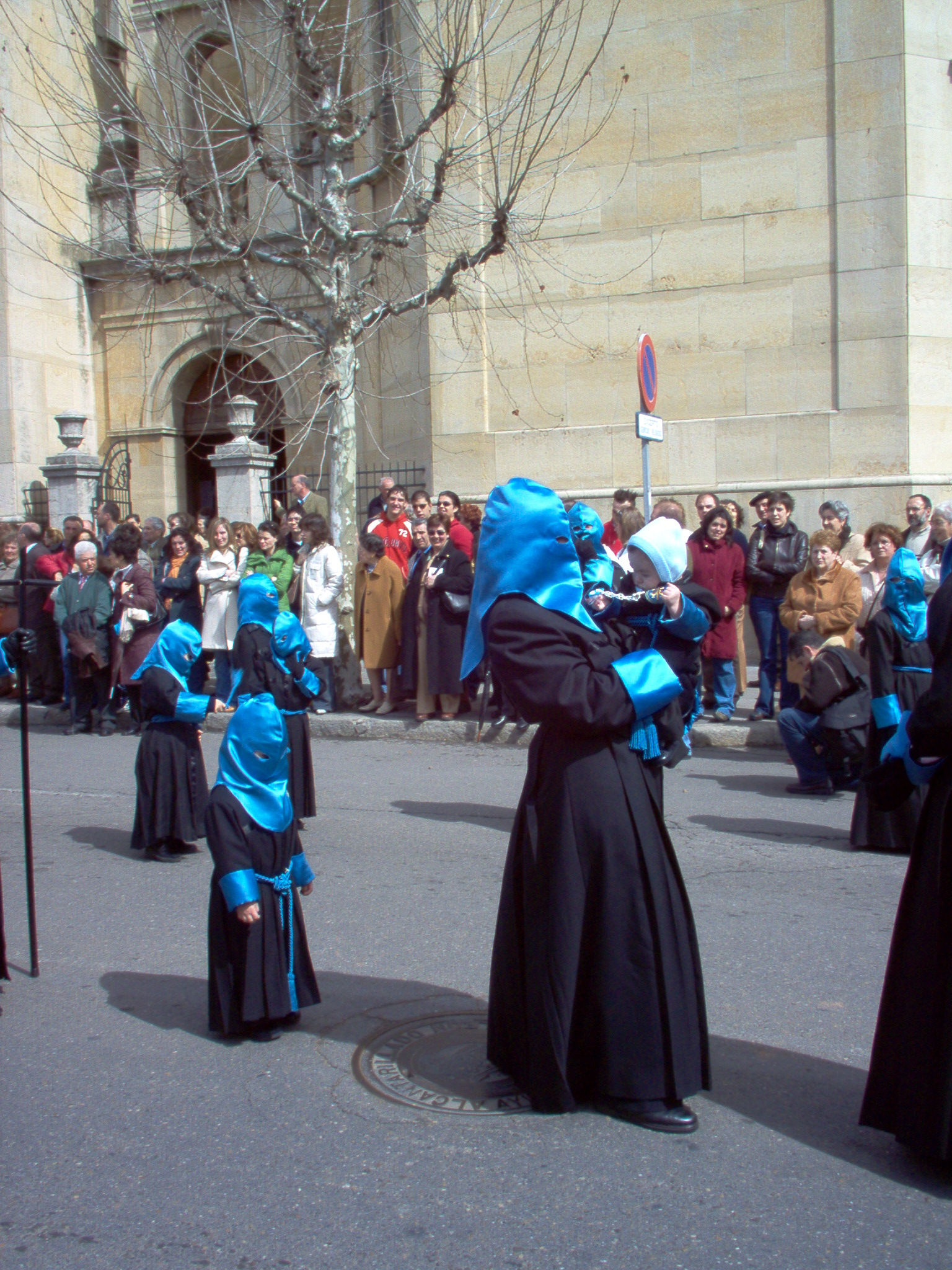
Procession of the Confraternity of Santo Cristo de la Bienaventuranza walking past the church of San Claudio in León, 2005.

Saints Claudius, Lupercus or Lupercio, and Victorius or Victoricus (d. c. 300) are said to have been the sons of St Marcellus. They were said to have been martyred at León, Spain, during the reign of the Emperor Diocletian. Their relationship to Marcellus is probably apocryphal, though it was accepted in subsequent breviaries and hagiographies as well as the Roman Martyrology, which placed all four saints under October 30. However, it is quite possible that Claudius, Lupercus, and Victorius were soldiers of Spanish origin who were killed at León, as tradition states. Many churches in Spain were dedicated to them, including the ancient Benedictine abbey of San Claudio, in Galicia. The town of San Claudio, near Oviedo, takes its name from this group of martyrs.

Their relics were translated several times in succeeding centuries. King Ferdinand I of Castile transported some of their relics to the church of San Isidoro in León. In 1173, the relics were translated to a new church dedicated to the three martyrs. This church was destroyed in 1834 and the relics were moved to the church of San Marcelo, dedicated to their presumed father. Their feast day is celebrated in Spain and Portugal on October 30.

Victorius or Victoricus should not be confused with the French saint of the same name. Another Lupercus or Luperculus was a bishop of Eauze who was venerated as a martyr, and sometimes identified as an uncle of the Spanish saint Saint Engratia.

== See also ==
- Leonese people
- León province
