= Cassian of Tangier =

3rd-century Christian saint

Saints Cassian of Tangier
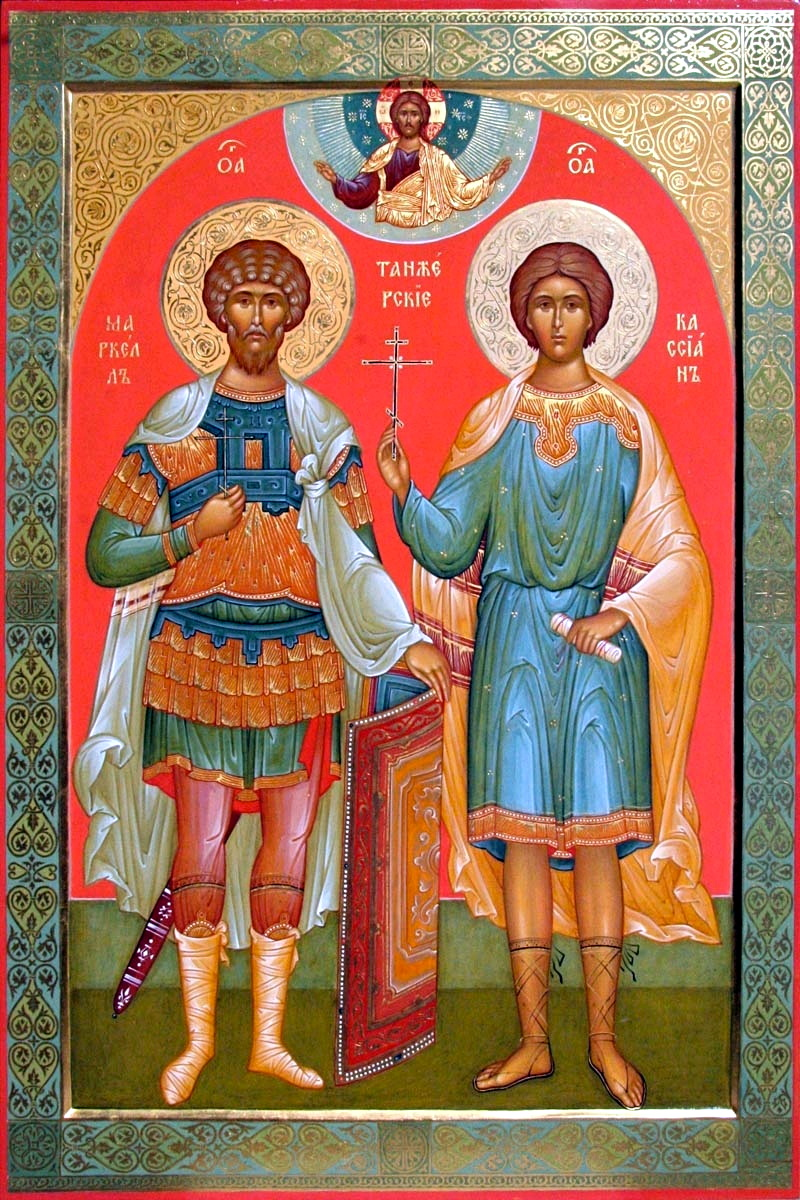
- Icon of Cassian of Tangier located in the Russian Orthodox Church of the Resurrection, Rabat

Martyr
- Born: c. mid 3rd century AD
- Died: 298 AD; Tingis, Mauretania Tingitana (modern-day Tangiers, Morocco)
- Venerated in: Catholic Church, Eastern Orthodox Church
- Canonized: Pre-Congregation
- Feast: December 3
- Patronage: Stenographers

Saint Cassian of Tangier (or of Tangiers or of Tingis) was a Christian saint of the 3rd century. He is traditionally said to have been beheaded on 3 December, AD 298, during the reign of Diocletian. The Passion of Saint Cassian is appended to that of Saint Marcellus of Tangier and his saint day is celebrated on 3 December.

== Life ==
According to it, he was a court recorder at the trial of St. Marcellus the Centurion. Aurelius Agricola, deputy prefect in the Roman province in North Africa, conducted the trial. When the death penalty was imposed on St. Marcellus, Cassian threw down his pen and declared that the sentence was unjust. He was arrested immediately and put to death a few days later on December 3.

== Veneration ==
Cassian is the patron saint of modern stenographers. Saint Cassian of Tangier is the martyr mentioned by St. Prudentius (born 348) in his hymn Liber Peristephanon (De Coronis Martyrum) (Carmen IV, 45-48 ): "Ingeret Tingis sua Cassianum, festa Massylum monumenta regum, qui cinis gentes domitas coegit. ad iuga Christi."

== Sources ==
- O'Malley, Vincent J. (14 September 2001). Saints of Africa. Our Sunday Visitor Publishing. p. 164. ISBN 978-1-61278-276-8.
