= Cave of Hercules =

Subterranean vaulted space in Toledo, Spain

Coordinates: 39.8586°N 4.0244°W

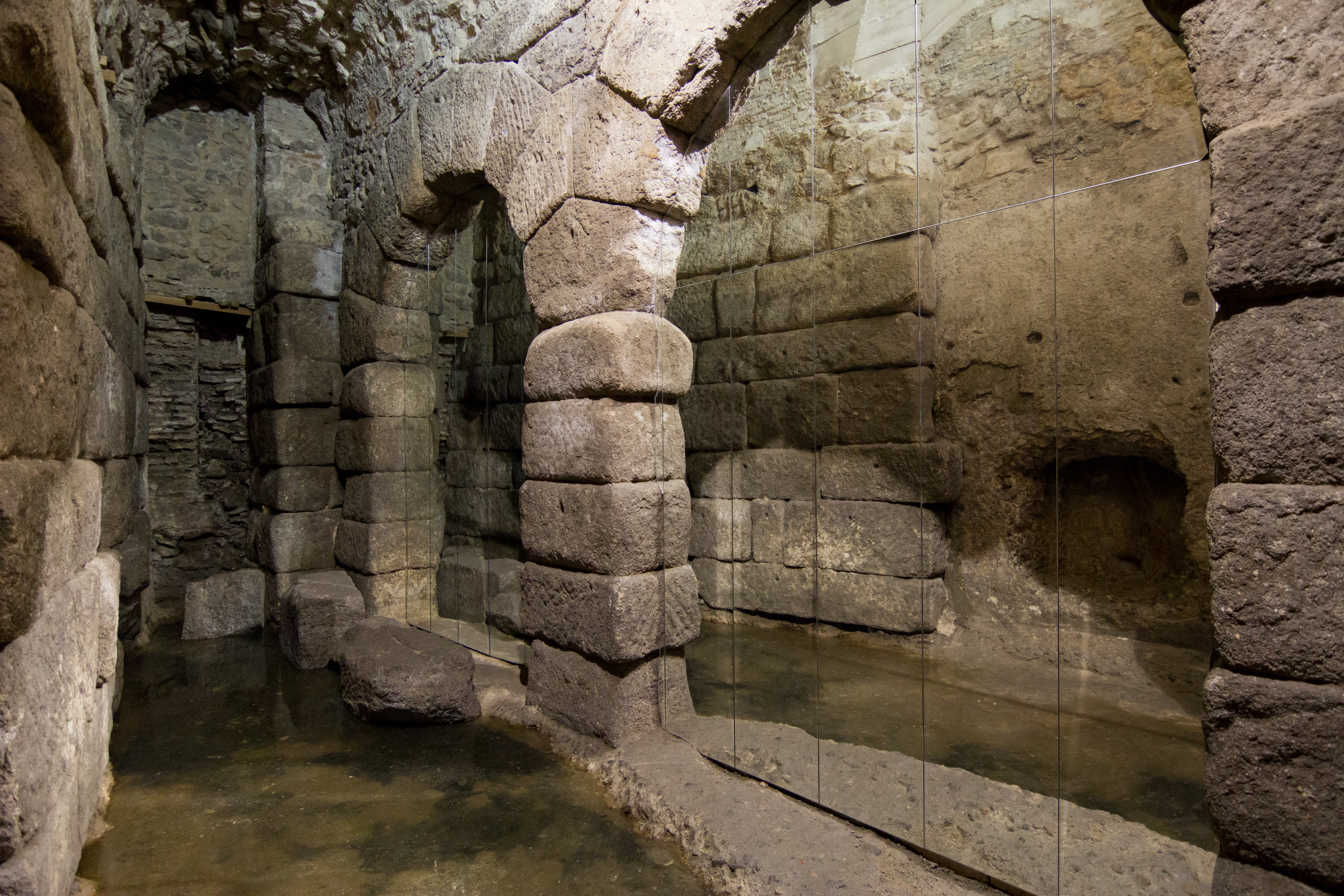
Portal to the building where the Cave of Hercules is located

The Cave of Hercules (Spanish: Cueva de Hércules) is a subterranean vaulted space dating back to Roman times located in the alley of San Ginés (Spanish: Callejón San Ginés) in the city of Toledo, Spain. The cave is under a building located where the Church of San Ginés, Toledo stood until 1841.

== History ==
The structure was likely constructed in the time of the Roman Empire, probably towards the second half of the 1st century. It appears to have been a water reservoir supplied via the aqueduct bridge which brought water across the River Tagus.

It is located in the east corner of the current courtyard and was built in two construction phases. It was covered with a barrel vault, realized in ashlar, and displayed the aspect of a great tank to the open sky, with an overflow at the edge. The first half of the wall, made in Roman concrete and covered with opus signinum, is preserved, and overlooks San Ginés alley.

The structure was deeply altered with the construction of an arcade of three arches of ashlars in the southwest side. This divides the primitive one in two and currently separates it from the other half of the deposit, belonging to No. 2 of San Ginés street. It is unknown whether this change occurred in the first or second phase of construction. The second half of the northeast wall that faces the street was constructed in the second Roman phase. A facade was built in opus quadratum of seven rows of ashlars of varying size, which is attached to the northeast lateral wall of the hydraulic structure of the first phase. The size was increased from the northwest to the southeast by creating a new line of orientation to the wall, which is the one that generates the trapezoidal plant that will have the nave. In this space, different rupture interfaces are observed along the entire surface.

In the Visigothic era, it is probable that there was a Visigothic church on the property. In the Al-Andalus period, constructions were developed, probably a mosque, in whose walls were embedded Visigothic reliefs. This mosque followed a structure similar to others of the city, being a small oratory with practically square plant, four interior columns and nine vaults or domes.

The first references to this property as the church of San Ginés come from 1148. At the end of this Late medieval epoch, or the beginning of the Early modern age, a series of changes were made, such as the creation of five individual chapels.

The building deteriorated during a prolonged period of the Early modern era. Abandoned and closed to the public during the 18th century, the church was demolished in 1841. The wall of the entrance, where several Visigothic reliefs are embedded, was partially preserved, as were the remains of the sacristy. The lot, including the vaults beneath, was put up for sale and was parceled out among several neighbors.

== See also ==
- Caves of Hercules

== Exhibitions ==
The entrance to the Caves leads the visitor through a wide space with a metal and glass structure that houses the Museum of the Caves of Hercules, where you can see exhibitions of contemporary artists, organized by the Consorcio de Toledo.
