= Abyla =

Roman colony in northwest Africa

Ad Septem Fratres
- Septem, Abyla
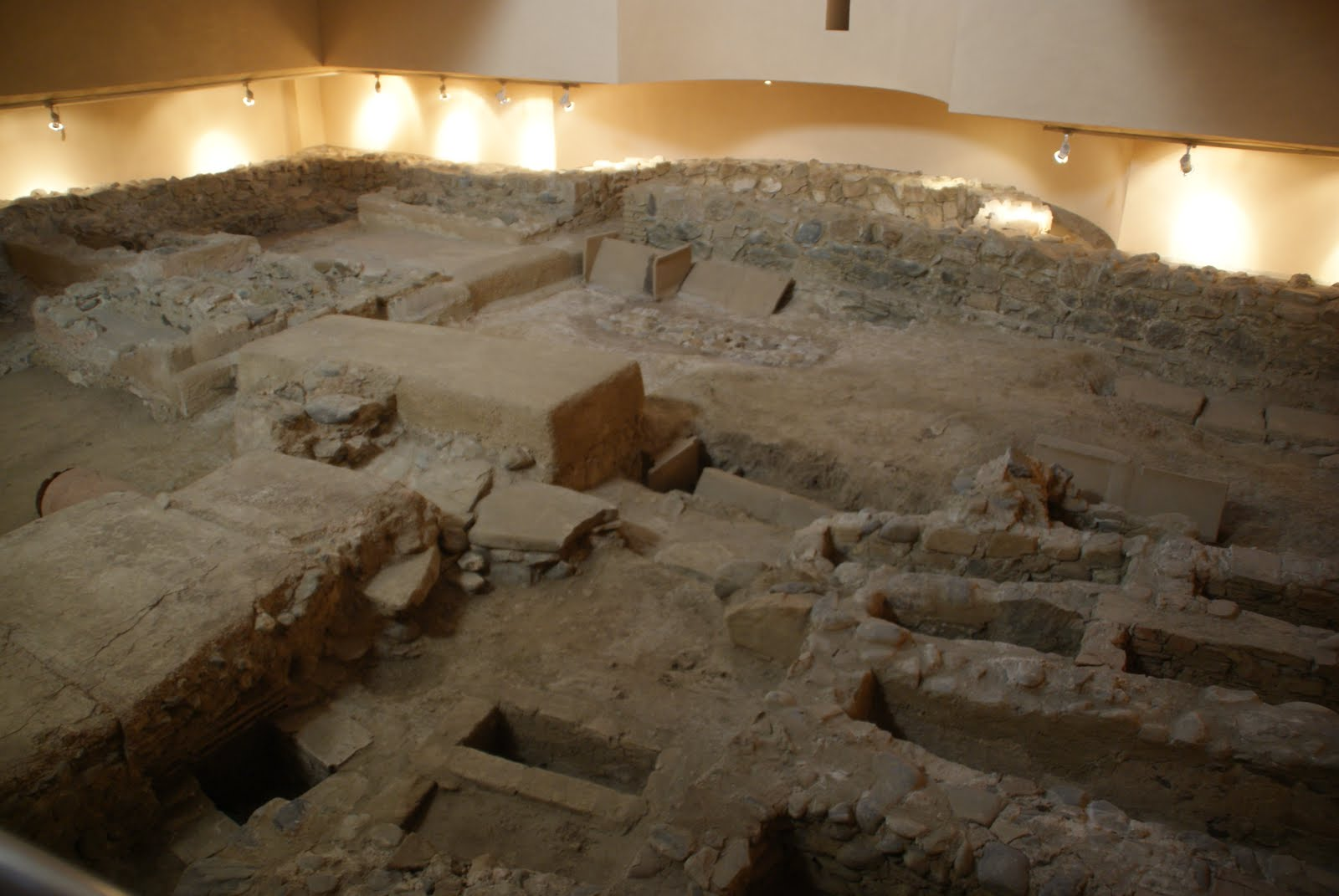
- Ruins of an early Christian basilica in Ceuta

- Location within Spain
- 35°53′18″N 5°18′56″W
- Location: Ceuta, Spain

Abyla was the pre-Roman name of Ad Septem Fratres (Ceuta, Spain). Ad Septem Fratres, usually shortened to Septem or Septa, was a Roman colony in the province of Mauretania Tingitana and a Byzantine outpost in the Exarchate of Africa. Its ruins are located within present-day Ceuta, an autonomous exclave of Spain, which borders Morocco.

== Names ==
The name Abyla is said to have been a Punic name ("Lofty Mountain" or "Mountain of God") for Jebel Musa, the southern Pillar of Hercules. It appears in Greek variously as Abýla (Ἀβύλα), Abýlē (Ἀβύλη), Ablýx (Ἀβλύξ), and Abílē Stḗlē (Ἀβίλη Στήλη, "Pillar of Abyla") and in Latin as Mount Abyla (Abyla Mons) or the Pillar of Abyla (Abyla Columna).

The settlement below Jebel Musa was later renamed for the seven hills around the site, collectively referred to as the "Seven Brothers" (Ancient Greek: Ἑπτάδελφοι, Heptádelphoi; Latin: Septem Fratres). In particular, the Roman stronghold at the site took the name "Fort at the Seven Brothers" (Castellum ad Septem Fratres). This was gradually shortened to Septem (Σέπτον, Sépton) or, occasionally, Septa. It continued as Sebtan or Sabta (Arabic: سبتة) during the Middle Ages.

== History ==
=== Punic ===
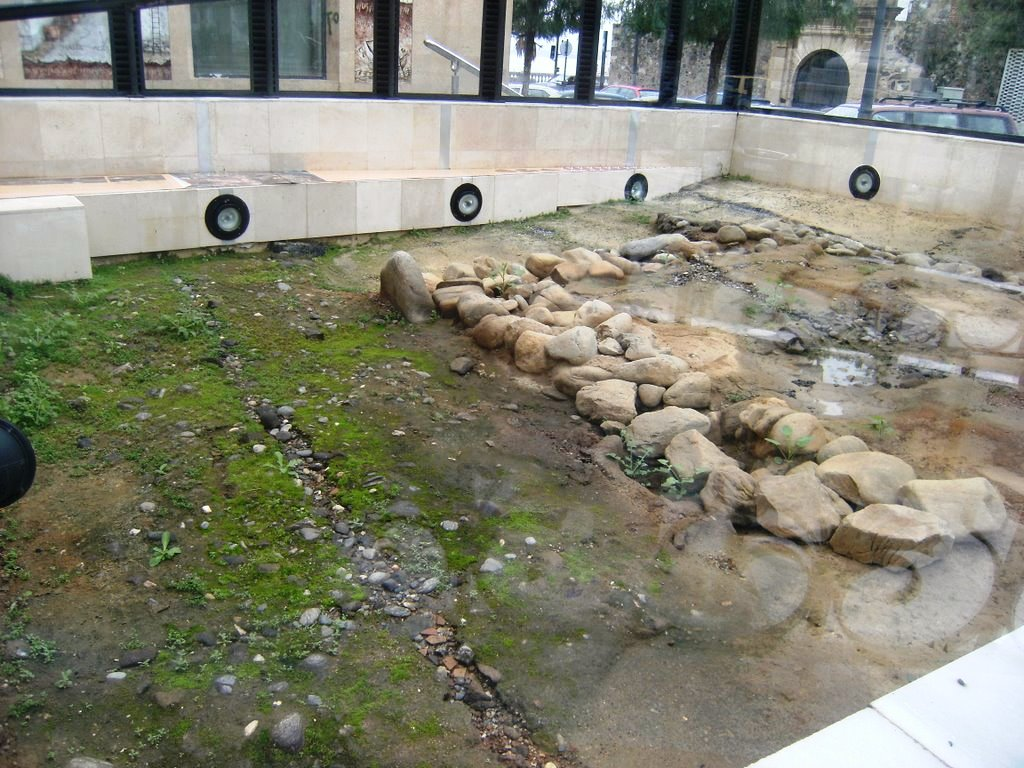
Phoenician ruins

The Phoenicians founded a Berber-Punic settlement on the Strait of Gibraltar at Septem; however, because the extremely narrow isthmus joining the Peninsula of Almina to the Maghreb makes the site eminently defensible, the Phoenicians swiftly made it their own. Abyla was one of a number of settlements in the region, —including Tinga (Tangier), Kart (San Roque), and Gadir (Cádiz)—that helped the Phoenicians and Carthaginians control maritime trade between the Atlantic and the Mediterranean.

=== Mauretanian ===
After the fall of Carthage in the Punic Wars, most of the coastal, northwestern Maghreb was left to the Roman client states and the lybico-berber-Mauri Kingdoms of Numidia and Mauretania. Punic culture continued to thrive in Septem and throughout Mauretania; the region's residents mostly continued to speak Punic into the reign of Augustus.

=== Roman ===
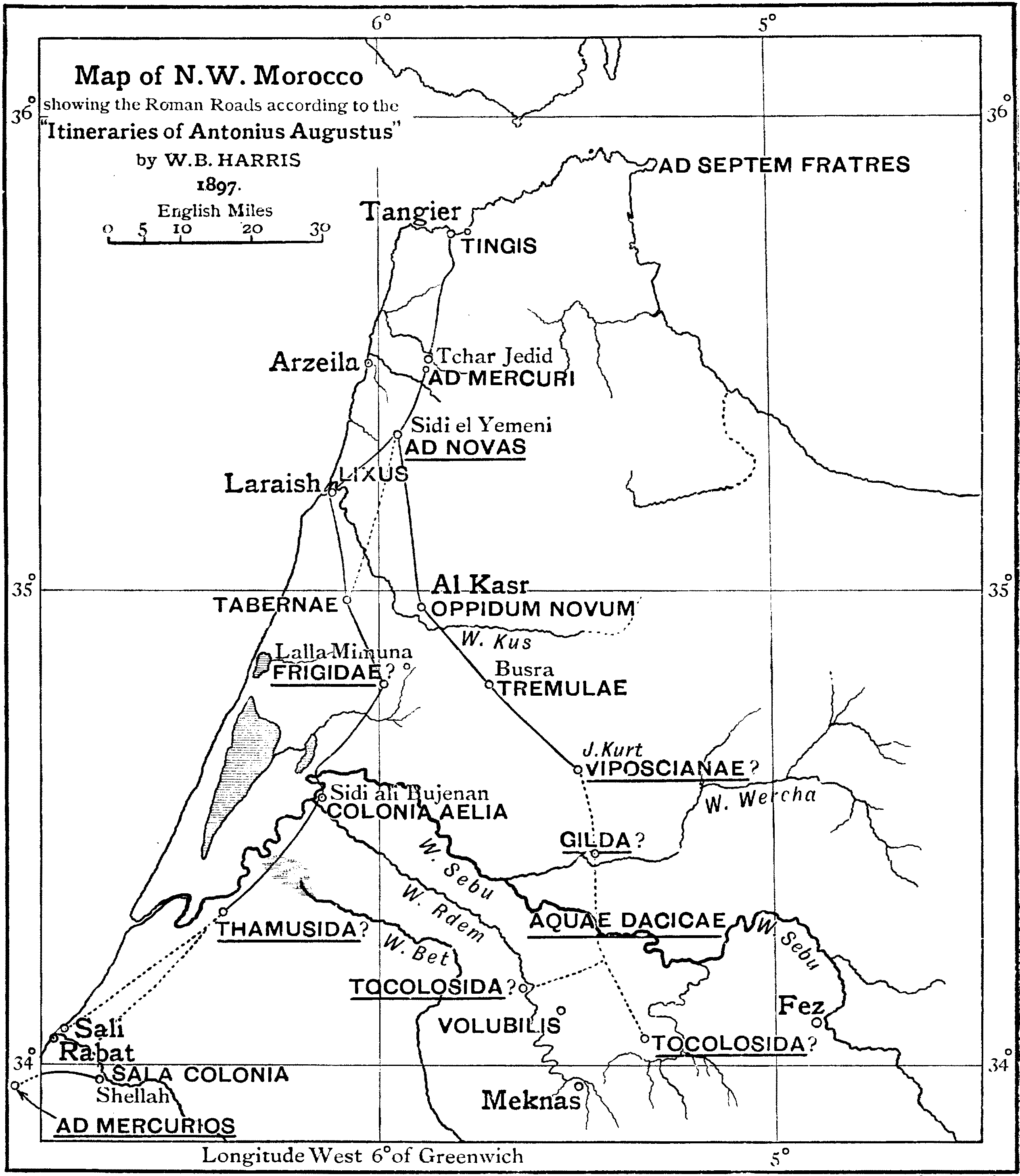
A late 19th-century reconstruction of the main Roman roads in Mauretania Tingitana.

Rome began exerting increasing control over the region, though, first through traders and advisors and then—particularly after Thapsus—through the incorporation of more and more towns and regions into directly administered provinces. Roman settlement at Septem began under Augustus. Caligula assassinated the Mauretanian king Ptolemy in AD 40 and seized his kingdom. Claudius organized the new territories in 42, placing Septem in the province of Mauretania Tingitana (administered from Tingis, present-day Tangiers) and raising it to the level of a colony, which gave Roman citizenship to its residents. Wealthy Romans from Claudius's and Nero's reigns are attested in funerary inscriptions found around the Septem basilica.

Controlling commercial and military access to the Gibraltar Strait, Septem flourished under the empire. Around AD 100, under Trajan, a local senate was made organized from the local nobles (ordo decurionum). The town was particularly known for its salt and salted fish, which expanded greatly after about AD 140 as new production centers opened up around the town forum. The salt, salted fish, and salted produce were exported—mainly across the strait to Roman Spain—in jars manufactured around the city. Roman roads also connected it over land with Tingis and Volubilis, increasing inland trade and security from Berber raiding. By the 2nd century, romanization was nearly complete and Latin appears in most surviving inscriptions. Alongside the Roman colonists, however, there remained a sizable community of romanized Berbers whose primary tongue continued to be local dialects mixed with Punic and Latin loanwords; this eventually became African Romance.

Around AD 200, Leptis Magna's emperor Septimius Severus included the town in some of the largesse with which he favored the region. The town's prosperity continued into the late 3rd century, after which production centers were abandoned and the use of currency falls off.

By the 4th century, Septem was an important Christian; one of the basilicas from this era has recently been rediscovered.) In the late 4th century, under Theodosius I, the city still had 10,000 inhabitants, nearly all Christian and Latin-speaking.

=== Vandal ===
Septem fell to the Vandals in 426.

=== Byzantine ===
By the time of Belisarius's reconquest of North Africa, the Vandals had already lost Septem to local Berber (Mauri) revolts. The Byzantines retook the entire coastline, then established their "Commander of Mauretania" (Dux Mauretania) at the more defensible Septem instead of the old capital at Tingis. Mauretania and the Byzantine holdings in Andalusia were nominally part of the Exarchate of Africa but so distant that it is likely the garrison at Septem was forced to do homage to Visigothic Spain.

=== Islamic ===
There are no reliable contemporary histories concerning the end of the Islamic conquest of the Maghreb around the year 710. Instead, the rapid Muslim conquest of Spain produced romances concerning Count Julian of Septem and his betrayal of Christendom in revenge for the dishonors that befell his daughter at the Visigothic court of King Roderick. Allegedly with Julian's encouragement and instructions, the Berber convert and freedman Tariq ibn Ziyad took his garrison from Tangiers across the strait and overran the Spanish so swiftly that both he and his Persian master Musa bin Nusayr fell afoul of a jealous caliph, who stripped them of their wealth and titles.

After the death of Julian, sometimes also described as a king of the Ghomara Berbers, Berber converts to Islam took direct control of Septa. It was then destroyed during their great revolt against the Caliphate around 740.

Septa subsequently remained a small village of Muslims and Christians surrounded by ruins until its resettlement in the 9th century by Mâjakas, chief of the Majkasa Berber tribe, who started the short-lived Banu Isam dynasty. The continuing existence of an embattled Christian community is attested by the martyrdom of St. Daniel Fasanella and his Franciscans in 1227; it subsequently survived until the town's capture by the Portuguese re-established the Roman Catholic Diocese of Ceuta on 4 April 1417. The Ceuta Cathedral was then raised on the site of old Septem's 6th-century church.

== See also ==
- Ceuta
- Tingis
- Mauretania Tingitana
- Tamuda
- Rusadir
- Volubilis
