= Ceuta Cathedral =

Roman Catholic cathedral in Ceuta, Spain

- Cathedral of Saint Mary of the Assumption
- Catedral de Santa Maria de la Asunción
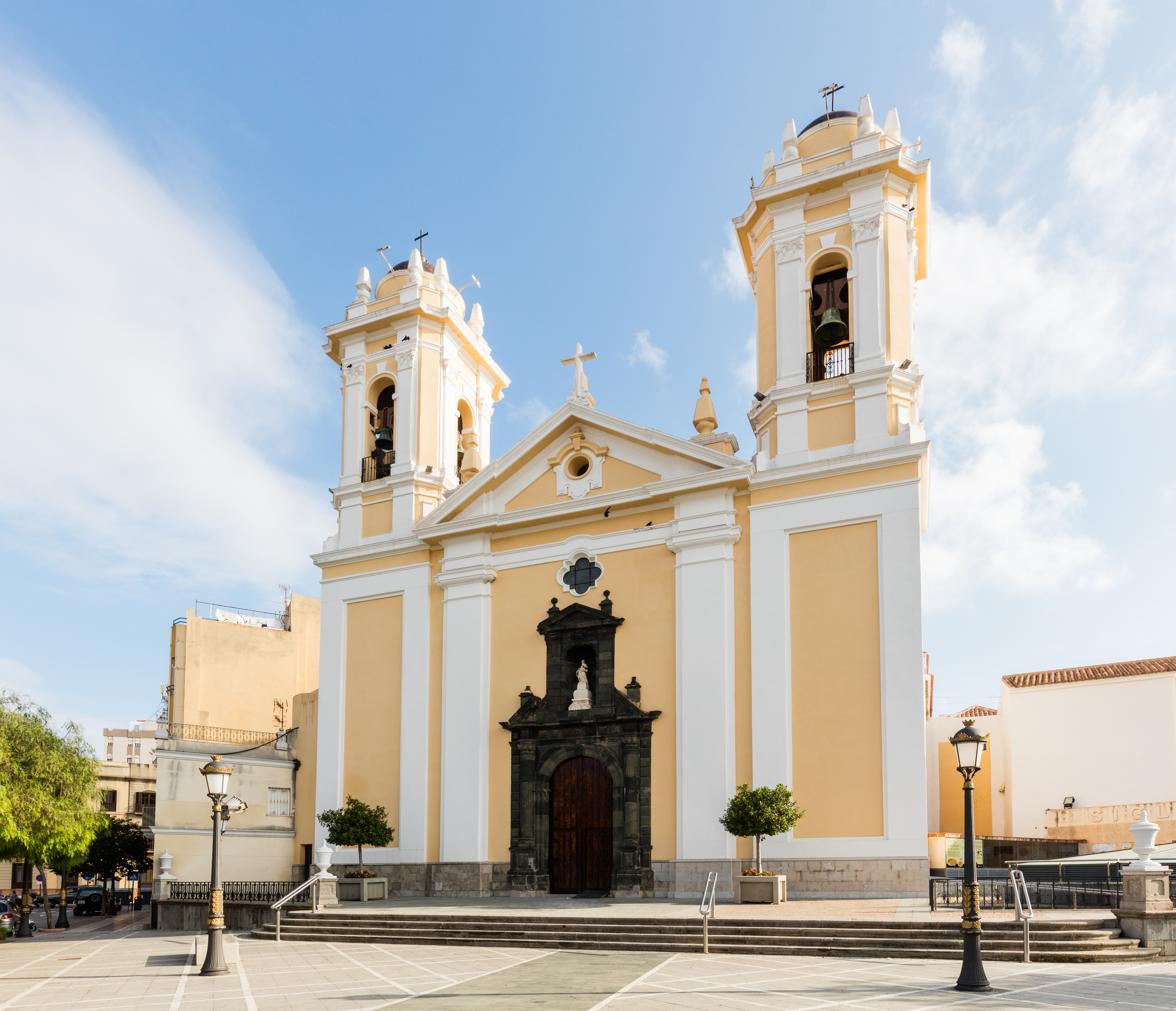
- West façade in 2015.
- Ceuta Cathedral
- 35.88807°N 5.31687°W
- Location: Ceuta
- Address: 9, Plaza de Nuestra Señora de África
- Country: Spain
- Denomination: Catholic

History
- Status: Cathedral
- Dedication: Assumption of Mary
- Dedicated: 1726

Architecture
- Style: Neoclassical, Baroque, Renaissance
- Groundbreaking: 1686

Administration
- Metropolis: Seville
- Diocese: Cádiz and Ceuta

Clergy
- Bishop: Rafael Zornoza Boy

Spanish Cultural Heritage
- Type: Non-movable
- Criteria: Monument
- Designated: 18 November 2008
- Reference no.: RI-51-0012179

The Cathedral of St Mary of the Assumption (Spanish: Catedral de Santa María de la Asunción) is a Roman Catholic church located in the Spanish city of Ceuta, in a small exclave on the northwest coast of Africa.

A primitive Eastern Roman Christian church stood on the site, and some researchers have identified this with the one built in the 6th century by Emperor Justinian I. This was replaced by the old Great Mosque of Ceuta, an architectural work of enormous wealth, according to descriptions which have survived, and although it underwent several enlargements, hardly any remains of it are to be seen today.

After the Portuguese conquest of 1415, the Great Mosque was transformed into a Christian church by alterations, but there is no record of what they were. The passage of time and damage suffered by warlike incidents caused the ruin of the building, and at the end of the 17th-century it was decided to replace it by a new church designed by the architect Juan de Ochoa. Building work began in 1686, but many difficulties were suffered in the years which followed as a result of a great siege to which Ceuta was subjected, and the new cathedral was not consecrated until 1726, when it was dedicated to the Assumption of Our Lady.

Attached to the cathedral, there is a building housing the vicariate, secretariat, diocesan archive, library, cathedral museum, and other offshoots of the diocese, and there is also the bishop's palace, which surrounds a small triangular courtyard.

Important sights in the cathedral are the Chapel of the Most Holy Trinity, a Baroque altarpiece, and frescoes by Miguel Bernardini, besides three large canvases and a 15th-century figure of the Great Virgin, which is of Portuguese origin.
