= Cape Spartel =

Promontory on the northwestern tip of Morocco

Cape Spartel Arabic: رأس سبارطيل
- Cape
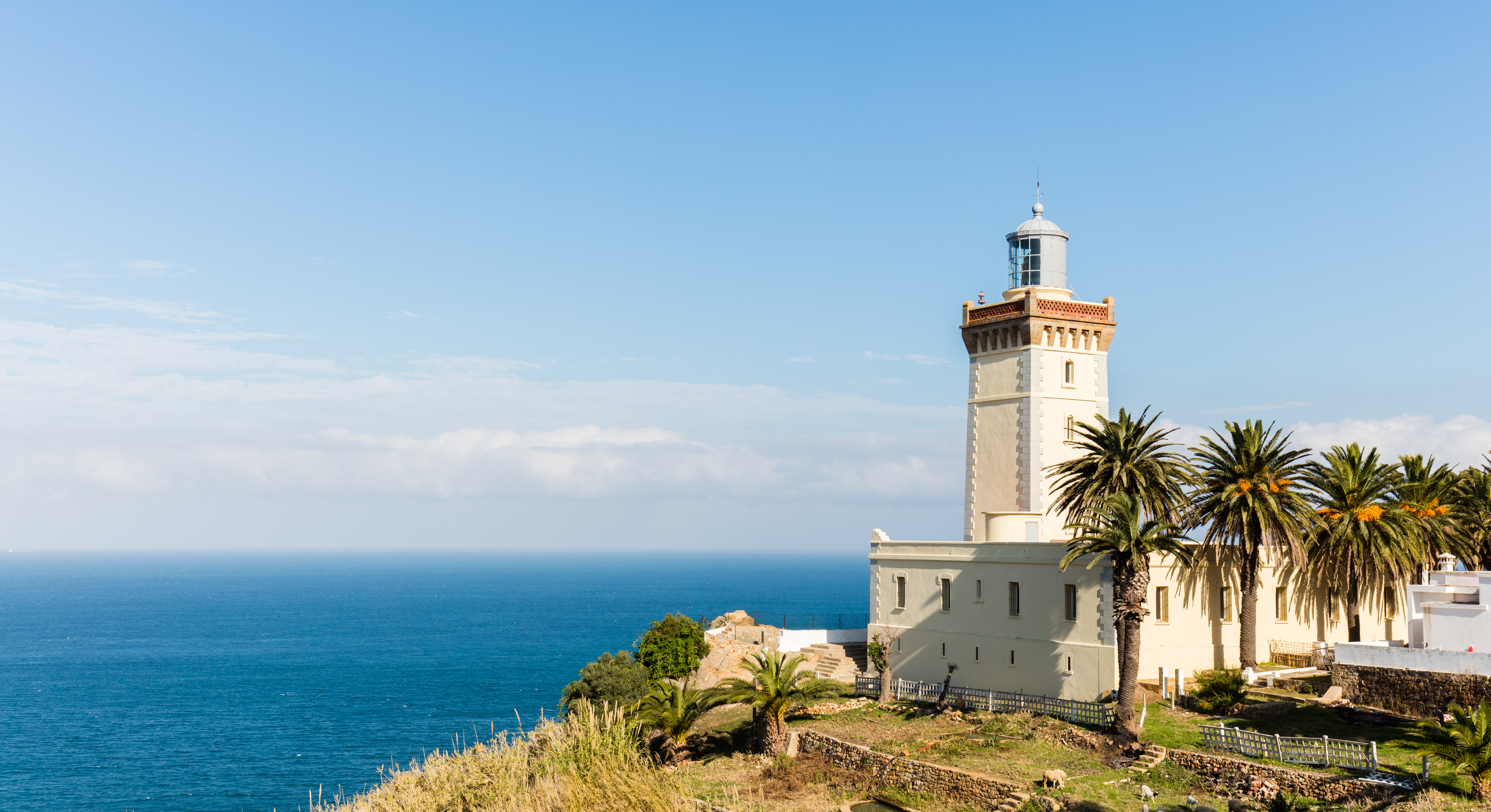
- Cape Spartel Lighthouse (2015)

- Location within Morocco
- Coordinates: 35°48′02″N 5°54′22″W
- Elevation: 306 m (1,005 ft)

Cape Spartel (Arabic: رأس سبارطيل; French: Cap Spartel; Spanish: Cabo Espartel) is a promontory in Morocco about 300 metres (980 ft) above sea level at the entrance to the Strait of Gibraltar, 12 km west of Tangier. It is the northwesternmost point of the African continent. Below the cape are the Caves of Hercules. The Cape Spartel Lighthouse is located at the cape of the same name, approximately 14 kilometers west of Tangier. This site marks the point where the Mediterranean and Atlantic waters meet. It is one of the largest lighthouses in Africa, marking the southern entrance to the Strait of Gibraltar on the Atlantic side. Under international law, the longitude of the Cape Spartel Lighthouse (5° 55' W) is recognized as the western limit of the Mediterranean Sea. It was kept in operation during the colonial period by a consortium of Western powers. It is currently one of the most famous tourist attractions in northern Morocco.

== Description ==
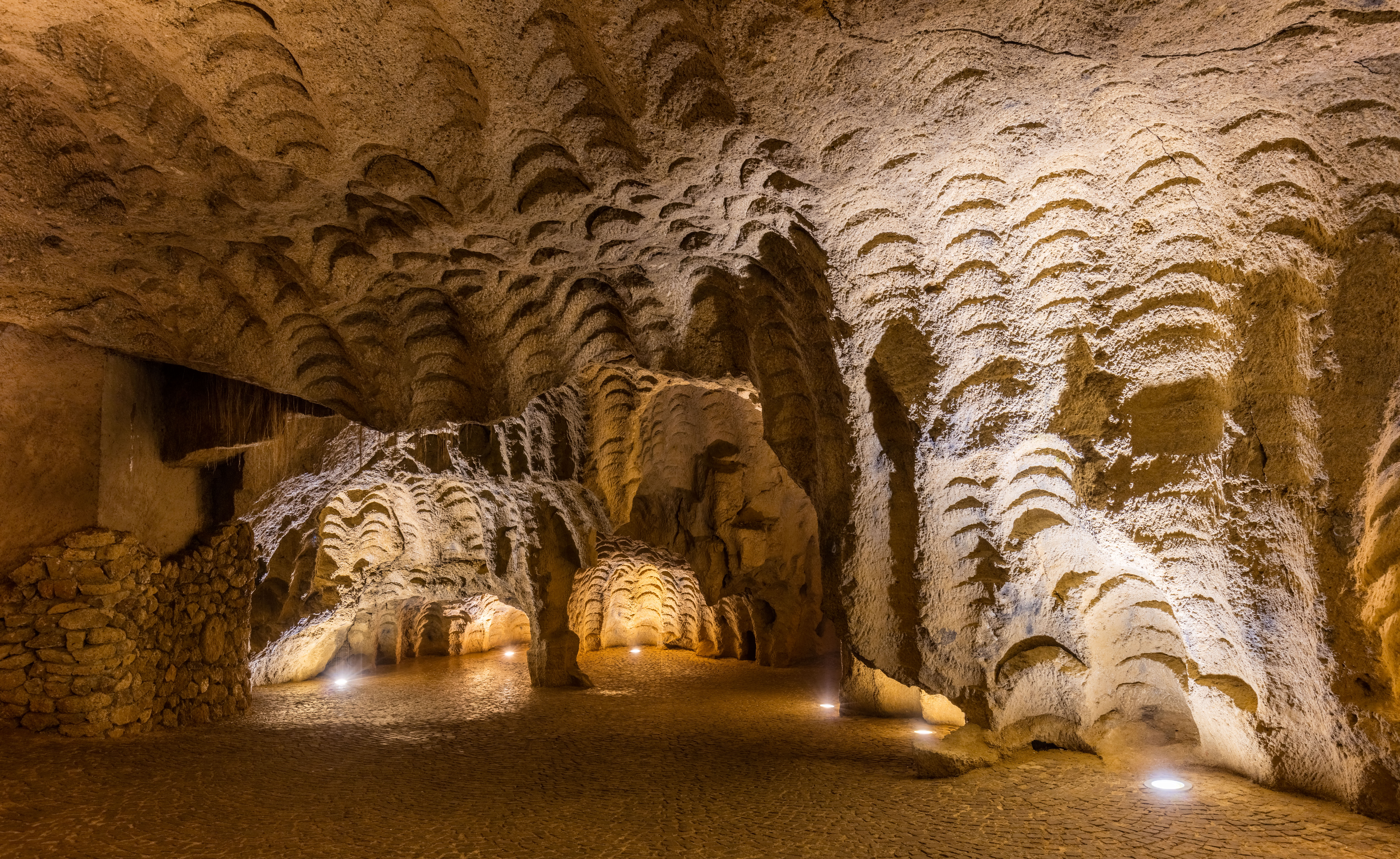
Caves of Hercules

Cape Spartel is frequently but incorrectly referred to as the northernmost point of Africa, which is instead Ras ben Sakka, Tunisia; it is the most northwestern point. The cape rises to a height of 326 m at the top of Jebel Quebir, where a lighthouse built by Sultan Muhammad IV in 1864 is situated at the end of a cliff.

Below the cape are the Caves of Hercules. These are open to the public and they are accessible from Robinson Plage. The caves have shown evidence of Neolithic occupation. Before they were a tourist attraction they were brothels. Historically the rock was mined and this is one important cause of the caves' creation.

Near Cape Spartel is Spartel Bank, a sunken island hypothesized by some as the location of the legendary island of Atlantis.

Renovation of the whole Cape Spartel site was started in 2020 and completed in 2021. It is now open to the public and includes a maritime museum, restaurant, botanical garden and an event space. Visitors can also access the top of the lighthouse to enjoy the stunning view of the strait of Gibraltar. Cape Spartel is accessible from the National Road S701.

== Historical events ==
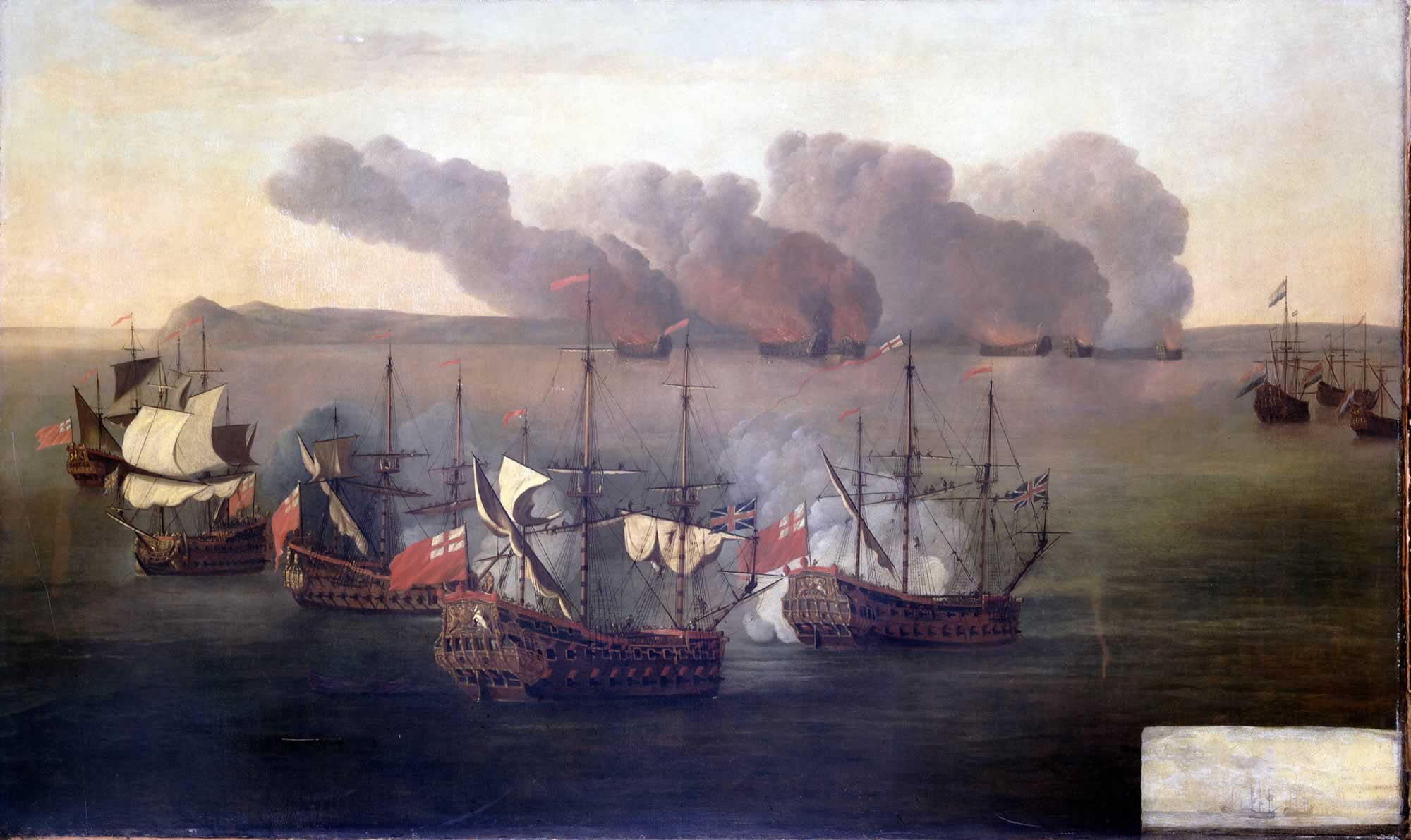
Beach and Van Ghent destroy six Barbary ships near the Cape, 17 August 1670

On 17 August 1670, a joint force of the English Royal Navy under Commodore Richard Beach and the Dutch States Navy under Willem Joseph van Ghent destroyed six ships of the Barbary pirates near Cape Spartel.

During the War of the Spanish Succession, two Spanish 60-gun ships – the Porta Coeli and Santa Teresa – were intercepted on 23 March 1704 by an English squadron under Vice-Admiral Thomas Dilkes off Cape Spartel, comprising the 70-gun ships Kent and Bedford and the 50-gun Antelope. The two Spanish warships, newly built at Orio, were laden with ordnance and military stores and were accompanied by a 24-gun merchantman, the San Nicolas. After a seven hours battle, both warships were captured; they were taken to Lisbon, but the Santa Teresa sank en route.

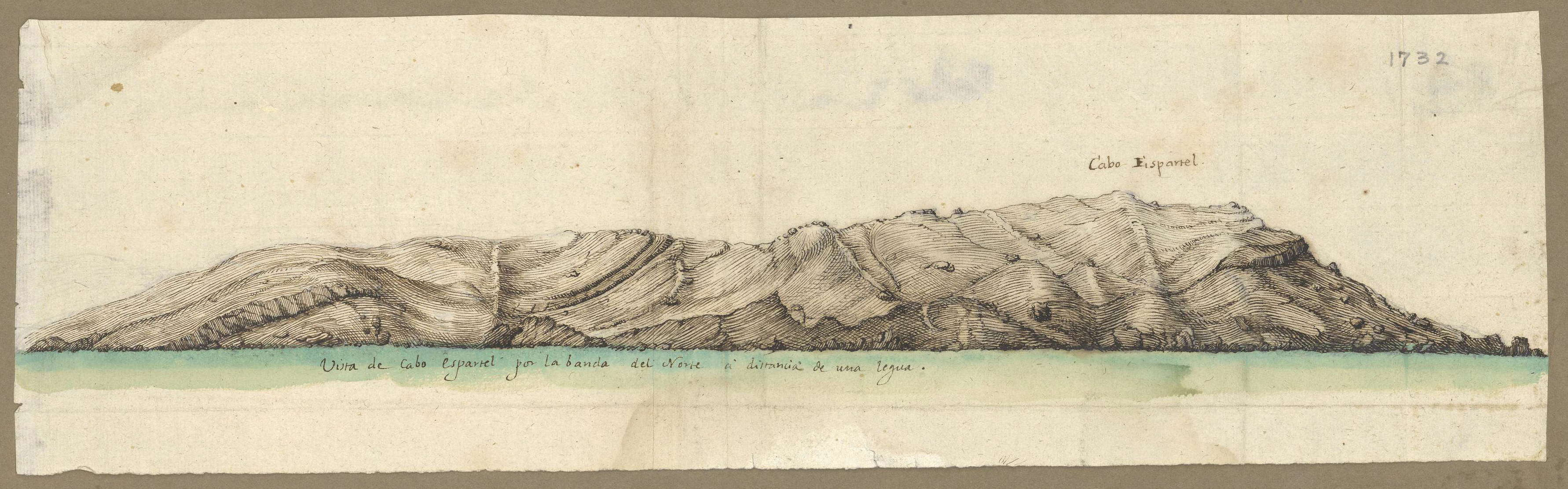
Cape Spartel in 1732.

On 20 October 1782, during the American Revolutionary War, an inconclusive battle took place between a British and Franco-Spanish fleet about 18 miles off the coast, the Battle of Cape Spartel, between ships under Admiral Luis de Córdova y Córdova and a British fleet under Admiral Richard Howe. The battle was required to maintain British supplies to the besieged Rock of Gibraltar.

In December 1911, the P&O liner Delhi ran aground near to Cape Spartel. All passengers were rescued by Royal Navy and French Navy warships, but three French rescuers were lost.

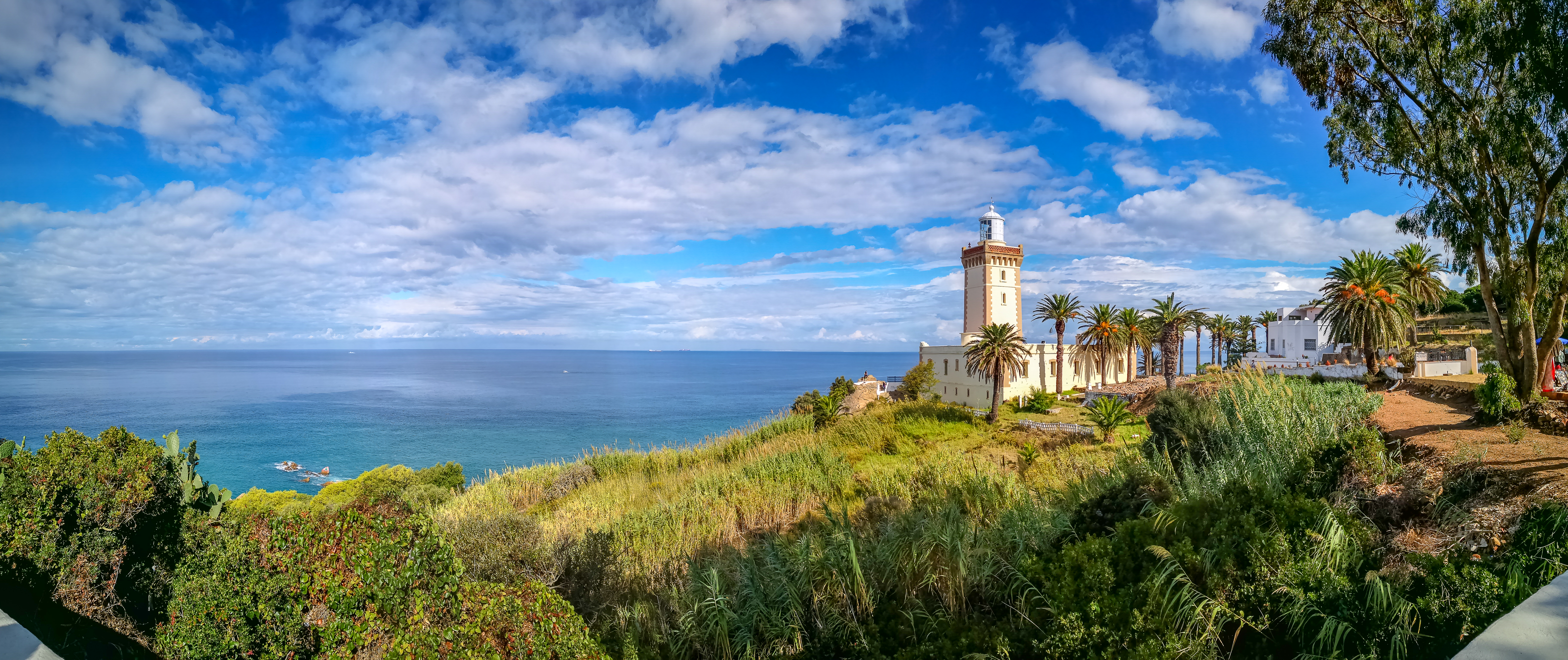
Cape Spartel lighthouse panorama

The Battle of Cape Spartel was a naval battle on 29 September 1936 during the Spanish Civil War. The engagement took place between two Nationalist cruisers and two Republican destroyers, and broke the Republican blockade of the Strait of Gibraltar, securing the naval supply route to Spanish Morocco for the Nationalists early in the war.

== See also ==
- Cape Malabata

== Bibliography ==
Media related to Cape Spartel at Wikimedia Commons

- F. Tamburini, Il faro di Capo Spartel (1865–1958), un esempio di cooperazione internazionale in Africa attraverso i secoli XIX e XX, in "Africana, Rivista di studi extraeuropei", n. IX, 2003
- S. L. Bensusan, Morocco, A. and C. Black, 1904
