= Russian Orthodox Church in Rabat =

Russian Orthodox Church in Rabat, Morocco

Coordinates: 34°0′42.80″N 6°51′7.44″W

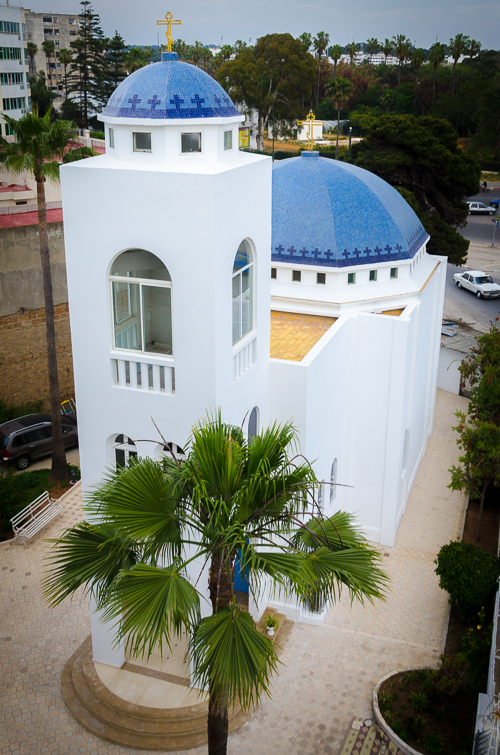
The Russian Orthodox Church in Rabat

Holy Resurrection Church (Russian: Церковь Воскресения Христова) in Rabat is the oldest of three functioning Orthodox churches in Morocco. It is under the jurisdiction of the Russian Orthodox Church.

== History ==
The first stone of the church was laid on July 6, 1931. The temple was consecrated on November 13, 1932, in honour of the Holy Resurrection of Jesus Christ by metropolitan Eulogius (Georgiyevsky).

The church was painted completely by icon-painters from Moscow in 2011.
