= Berber Christians =

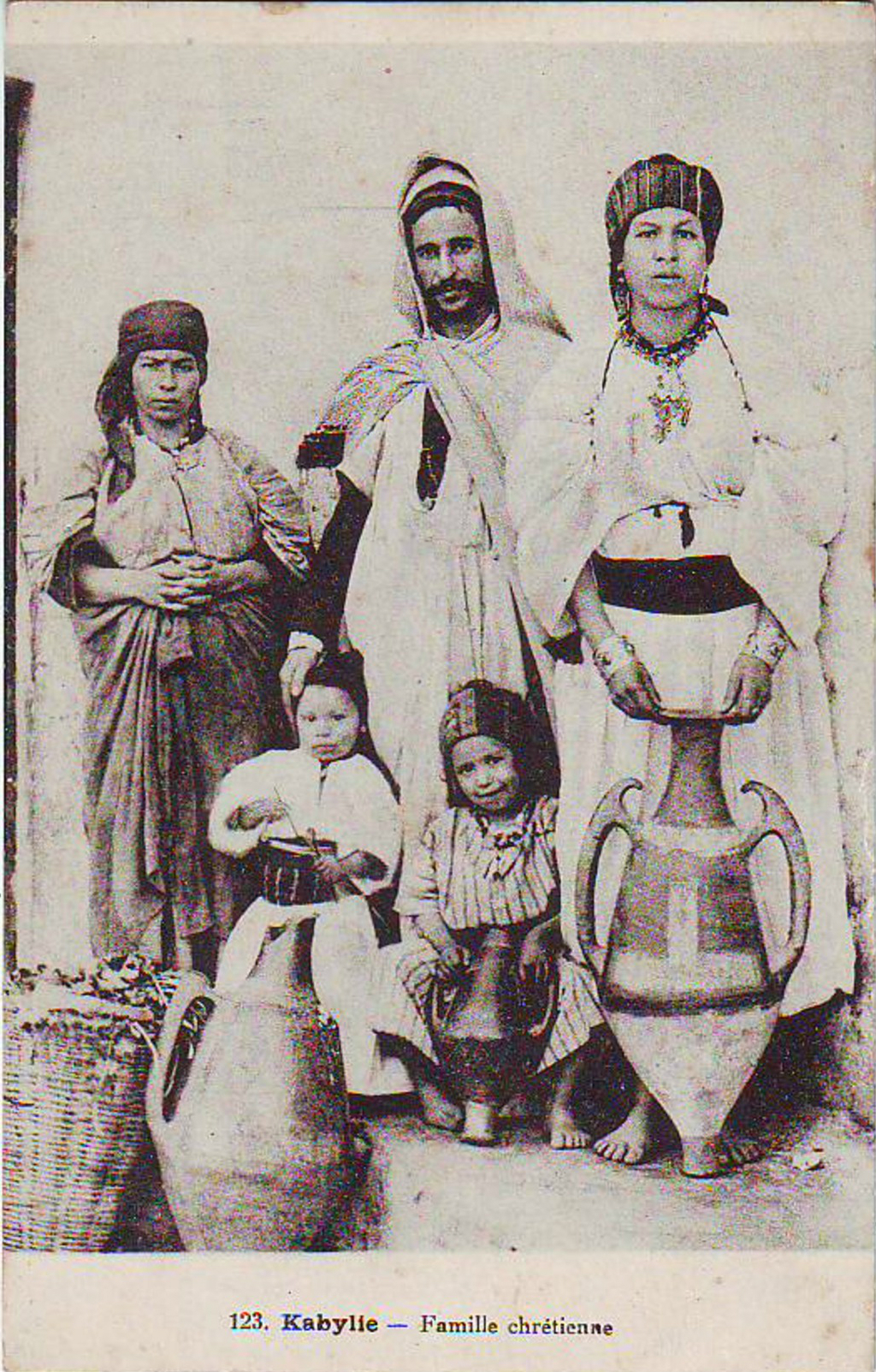
- Berber Christian family from Kabylia

Total population
- 325,000

Regions with significant populations
- France: 200,000
- Algeria: 50,000
- Morocco: 30,000
- Canada: 10,000
- Belgium: 10,000
- United States: 8,000
- Netherlands: 5,000
- Italy: 3,000
- Spain: 2,000
- Germany: 2,000
- Tunisia: 1,000
- Libya: 1,000

Languages
- Berber languages

Religion
- Catholicism and Protestantism

Berber Christians, or Amazigh Christians are ethnic Berbers who follow Christianity. The term is typically used to refer to the centuries when North Africa was under Roman rule, a period during which many of the local population, particularly the Berbers, adopted Christianity, and churches were built across the region. The Church of Carthage, in particular, became significant in the history of Christianity, playing a key role in the development of Christian philosophy and theology, and producing many prominent religious scholars and theologians.

From the late fifth and early sixth century, the region included several Christian Berber kingdoms. The Moroccan Church also experienced a distinct division, known as the Donatist sect, named after the Berber Christian bishop Donatus Magnus. Donatus advocated for the rejection of any priest, regardless of rank, who submitted to imperial authority, calling for martyrdom in defense of the faith. His call was especially embraced by those who were dissatisfied with the empire, particularly the lower classes. Donatism mainly spread among the indigenous Berber population, and Donatists were able to blend Christianity with many of the Berber local customs.

Following the Muslim conquest of the Maghreb (647–709 AD), Christianity experienced a gradual decline due to various factors. However, it continued to survive in the region for long time, as documented by sporadic sources. The erosion of Christian institutions intensified by the late 11th century, although some Christian communities lingered into the 14th century. By the 15th century, Christian Berber communities in Tunisia, Morocco, and Algeria had disappeared. However, with the revival of Christianity in the 19th century in the Maghreb, the number of Christian converts among the Berbers grew, particularly during and after the French colonial period. Estimates suggest that there are currently around half a million Christian Berbers, the majority of whom reside in the Maghreb, with significant diaspora communities in Western Europe and the Americas. As the number of Christian Berbers and the local church in the Maghreb grew, especially among those of Kabyle and Rifian origins, their influence began to shape the surrounding culture, impacting music, literature, and politics.

Several notable writers, theologians, and saints of Berber descent emerged, along with key figures in Christian history and Western Christianity. Among them were Donatus Magnus, Cyprian of Carthage, Arius, Saint Monica, and Alypius of Tagaste. Tertullian, regarded as the founder of "Western theology" and the "father of Latin Christianity", and Monica's son Augustine of Hippo, one of the most influential Fathers of the Church and key figures in Christian philosophy and Western thought, were also of Berber origin.

== Antiquity ==
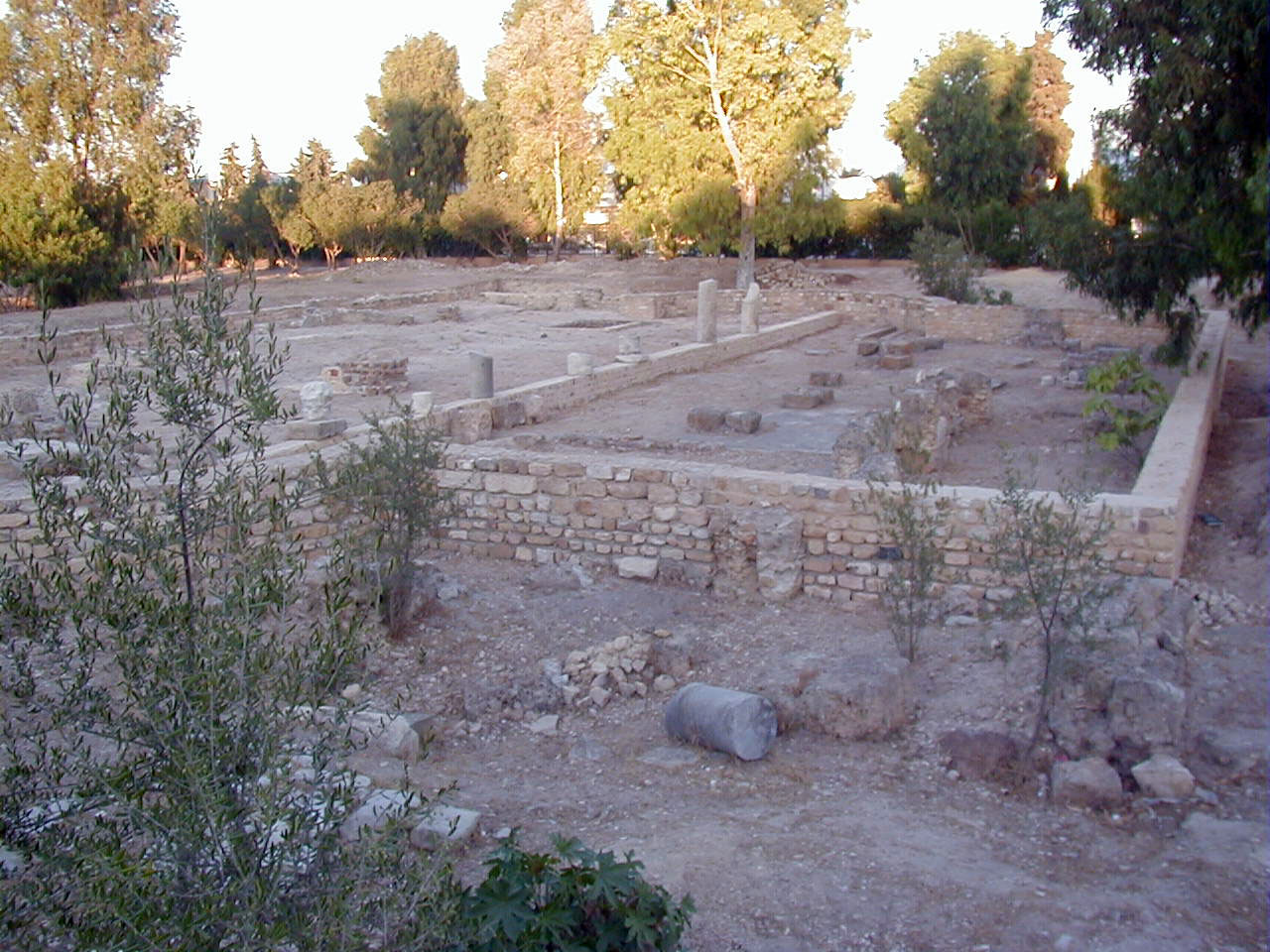
Early Christian quarter in ancient Carthage.

Christianity began spreading in North Africa in the 2nd century AD, initially in the Roman provinces of Cyrenaica and Tripolitania (modern-day Libya), later extending into Africa Proconsularis (Tunisia and parts of Algeria) and Tangier in Morocco. Early Christian communities faced persecution from the Roman Empire, particularly under Emperor Decius (250 AD), due to their refusal to worship Roman gods and join the army. Despite this, Coastal regions were the first to embrace Christianity, where Berber communities played a key role in its growth. Saint Augustine, a Berber Christian theologian and bishop of Hippo, became one of the most influential figures of the time. Augustine's authority on coercion was undisputed for over a millennium in Western Christianity, and according to Peter Brown, "it provided the theological foundation for the justification of medieval persecution". Another important Berber figure, Donatus, founded the Donatist movement, which resonated with Berber culture and their alienation from Roman authority. Despite Roman opposition, Christianity took root in these areas, with many early Christian figures, such as Tertullian, being of Berber origin.

=== Archdiocese of Carthage ===
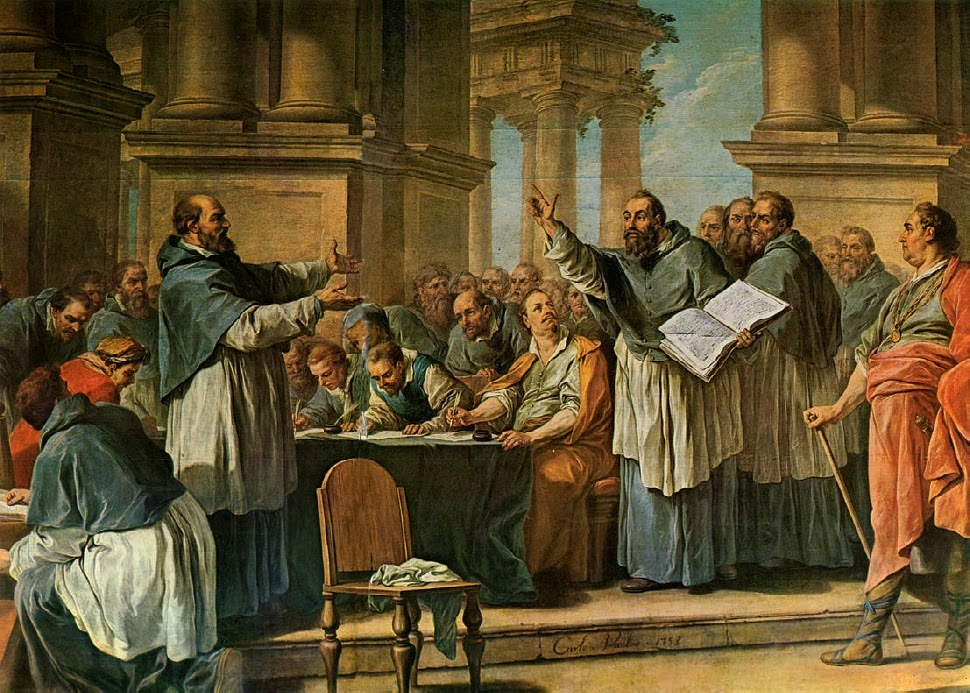
Augustine and donatists debating

During the 3rd century, Christianity became more organized in North Africa, with key figures like Saint Cyprian of Carthage and Tertullian helping to structure the Church and develop Christian theology. The Church of Carthage thus was to the Early African church what the Church of Rome was to the Catholic Church in Italy. The archdiocese used the African Rite, a variant of the Western liturgical rites in Latin language, possibly a local use of the primitive Roman Rite. Famous figures include Saint Perpetua, Saint Felicitas, and their Companions (died c. 203), Tertullian (c. 155–240), Cyprian (c. 200–258), Caecilianus (floruit 311), Saint Aurelius (died 429), and Eugenius of Carthage (died 505). Tertullian and Cyprian are considered Latin Church Fathers of the Latin Church. Tertullian, a theologian of part Berber descent, was instrumental in the development of trinitarian theology, and was the first to apply Latin language extensively in his theological writings. As such, Tertullian has been called "the father of Latin Christianity", and "the founder of Western theology".

Carthage, as a major center of Christianity, saw several important theological debates, including the Donatist controversy. This movement, led by Donatus, rejected bishops who had cooperated with Roman authorities during persecutions, and its support base was largely among the marginalized Berber populations, who saw it as a way to assert their identity and religious autonomy. Arius, the founder of Arianism, was of Berber origin. Arianism, which challenged the full divinity of Jesus, became one of the most contentious theological issues in early Christianity. His views sparked intense debates, particularly during the Council of Nicaea in 325 AD, where his teachings were vehemently opposed by orthodox Christian leaders. Carthage remained an important center of Christianity until 698, hosting several councils of Carthage.

The spread of Christianity in North Africa faced a major setback after the fall of the Roman Empire and the invasion of the Vandals in the 5th century. The Vandals imposed the Arian Christian doctrine, which conflicted with the Nicene orthodoxy practiced in the majority of Christian North Africa. The Byzantine Empire’s reconquest of the region in the 6th century sought to restore Orthodox Christianity, but tensions between various Christian sects, including Donatism and Arianism, persisted. Saint Augustine, one of the most influential African Christian theologians, was active in combating the Donatist movement and promoting church unity. Despite his efforts, the region remained divided, and the Church faced further challenges, particularly as the region struggled with both theological disagreements and political instability.

=== Berber Christian kingdoms ===
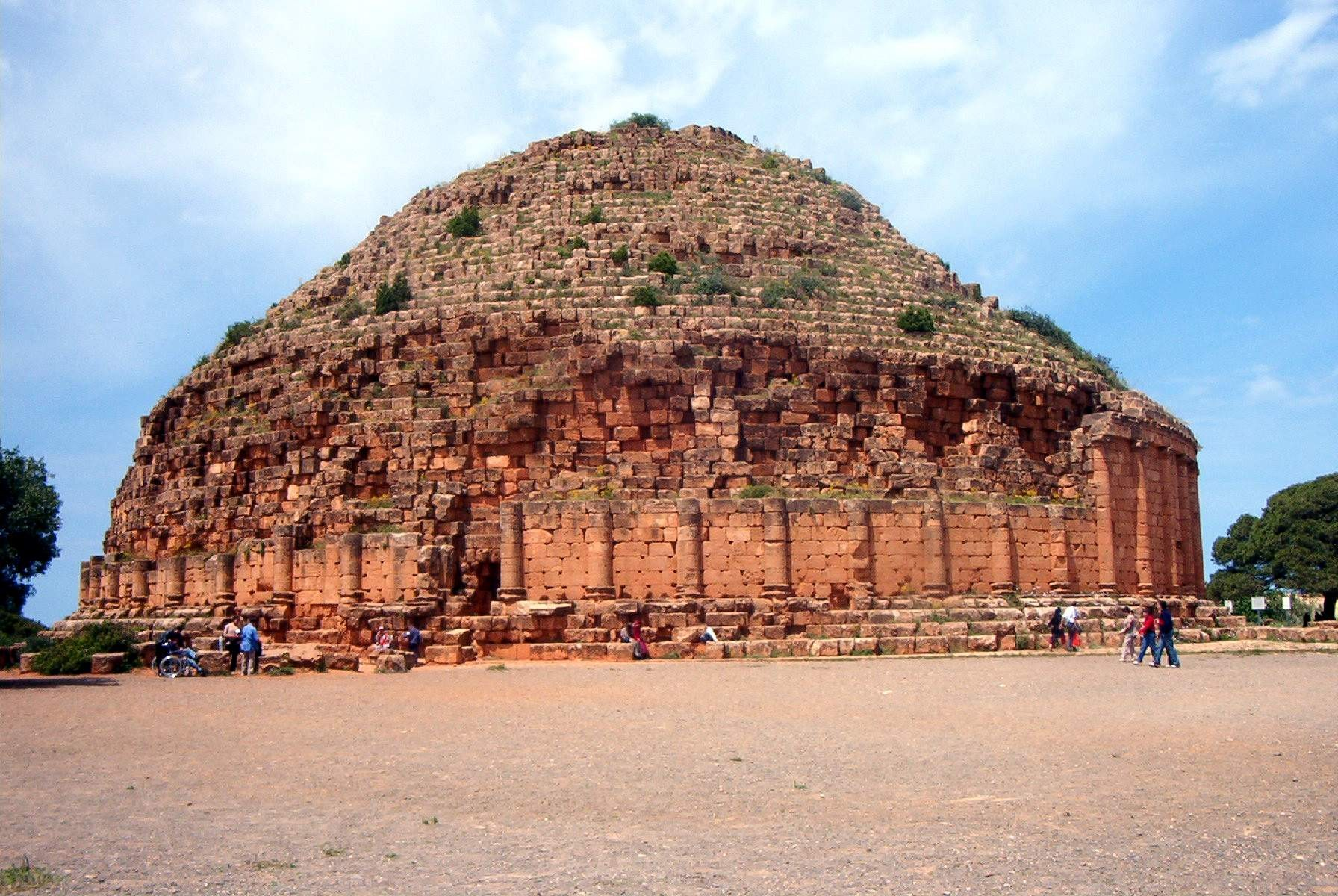
The Royal Mausoleum of Mauretania is one of the most prominent surviving artifacts from the era of Masuna, a ruler of the Christian Berber kingdom that emerged in the 4th century.

In the 4th and 5th centuries, North Africa became home to several Christian Berber kingdoms, including the Kingdom of Altava, the Kingdom of Ouarsenis, and the Kingdom of the Aurès. These kingdoms were Christianized, and their rulers often supported the spread of Christianity among their people. The Mauro-Roman Kingdom, centered in Altava (present-day Algeria), was a significant Berber Christian kingdom that controlled much of the ancient Roman province of Mauretania Caesariensis. It was an independent Christian kingdom for several centuries, with its capital in Altava serving as a religious and cultural center. This kingdom persisted until the rise of Islamic power in the region, and many Berber Christian communities, especially those in the mountain regions like the Aurès, continued practicing Christianity even as they faced increasing pressure from Islamic rule. The indigenous Christian population in some Nefzaoua villages persisted until the 14th century.

By the 7th century, the Islamic conquest of North Africa significantly transformed the religious landscape. Islam spread rapidly across the Maghreb, and Christian Berber kingdoms such as Altava and Ouarsenis fell under Islamic rule. While Christianity experienced a gradual decline under Muslim rule, some Berber Christian communities in isolated regions, such as the Nefzaoua, continued to practice their faith until the 14th century. These communities, however, eventually succumbed to the broader spread of Islam. The Christian Berber kings and their kingdoms, such as the Mauro-Roman Kingdom, were absorbed into the growing Islamic empire, marking the end of a distinct Christian Berber political and religious identity in the region.

== Islamic Era ==
=== The Arab Conquest and decline ===
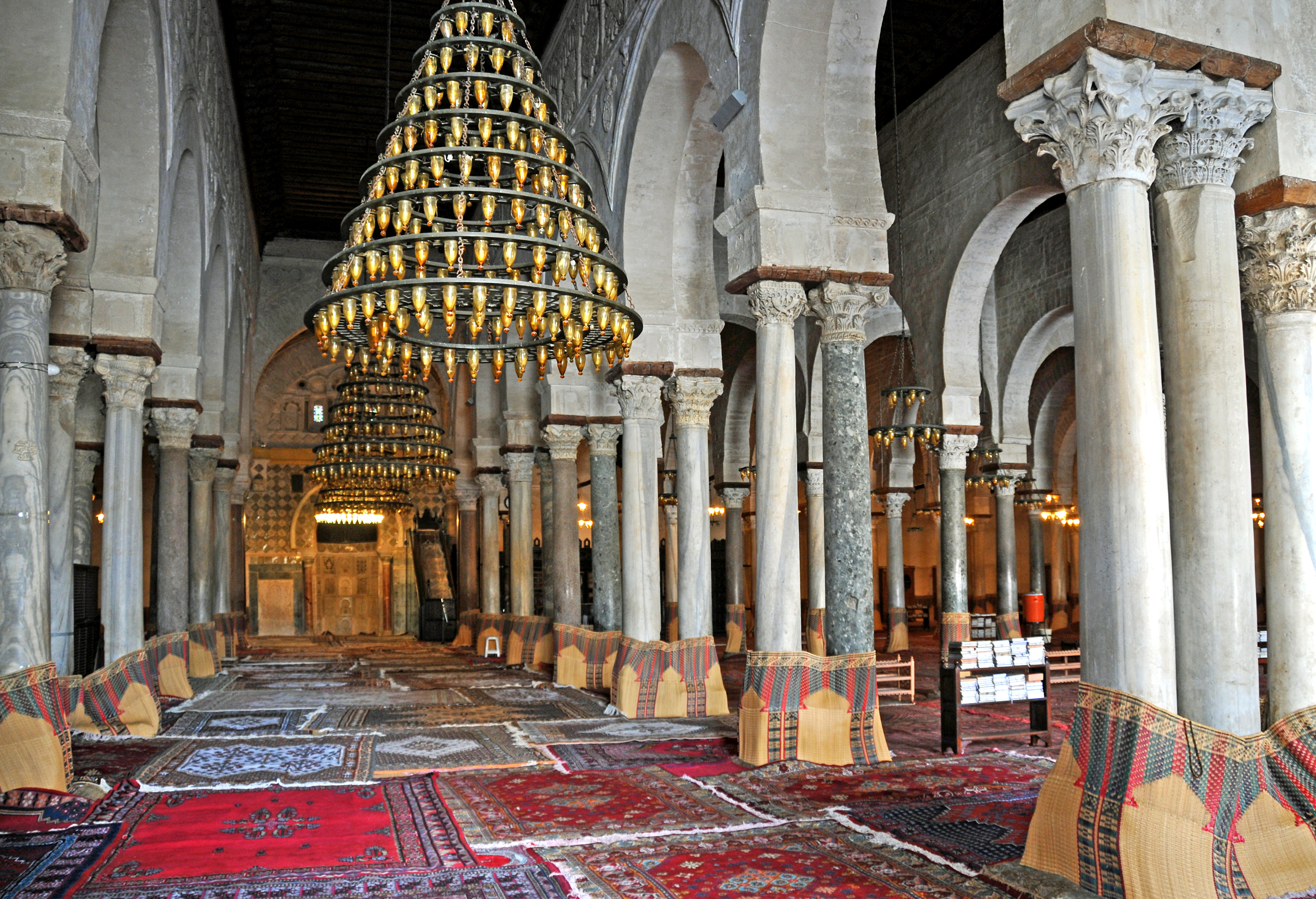
Prayer hall of the main mosque of Kairouan, with columns taken from former churches – arguably from Carthage.

Archaeological and scholarly research has shown that Christianity existed after the Muslim conquests. The Catholic church gradually declined along with local Latin dialect. According to a view, Christianity in North Africa effectively continued a century after the Muslim conquest but that neither the Church nor the ruling Byzantine veneer was able to resist the propagation of Islam, particularly since they were at odds with each other, and that without any particular persecution on the part of the Muslim rulers, who treated the Christians leniently because they were "People of the Book". Had the first Muslim conquerors persecuted the North African Christians rather than tolerating them, Christianity may well have continued to flourish.

Many causes have been seen as leading to the decline of Christianity in Maghreb. One of them is the constant warfare, as well as persecutions. In addition, many Christians migrated to Europe. The Church at that time lacked the backbone of a monastic tradition and was still suffering from the aftermath of heresies including the so-called Donatist heresy, and this contributed to the early obliteration of the Church in the present day Maghreb. Some historians contrast this with the strong monastic tradition in Coptic Egypt, which is credited as a factor that allowed the Coptic Church to remain the majority faith in that country until around after the 10th century despite numerous persecutions. In addition, the Romans were unable to completely assimilate the indigenous people like the Berbers.

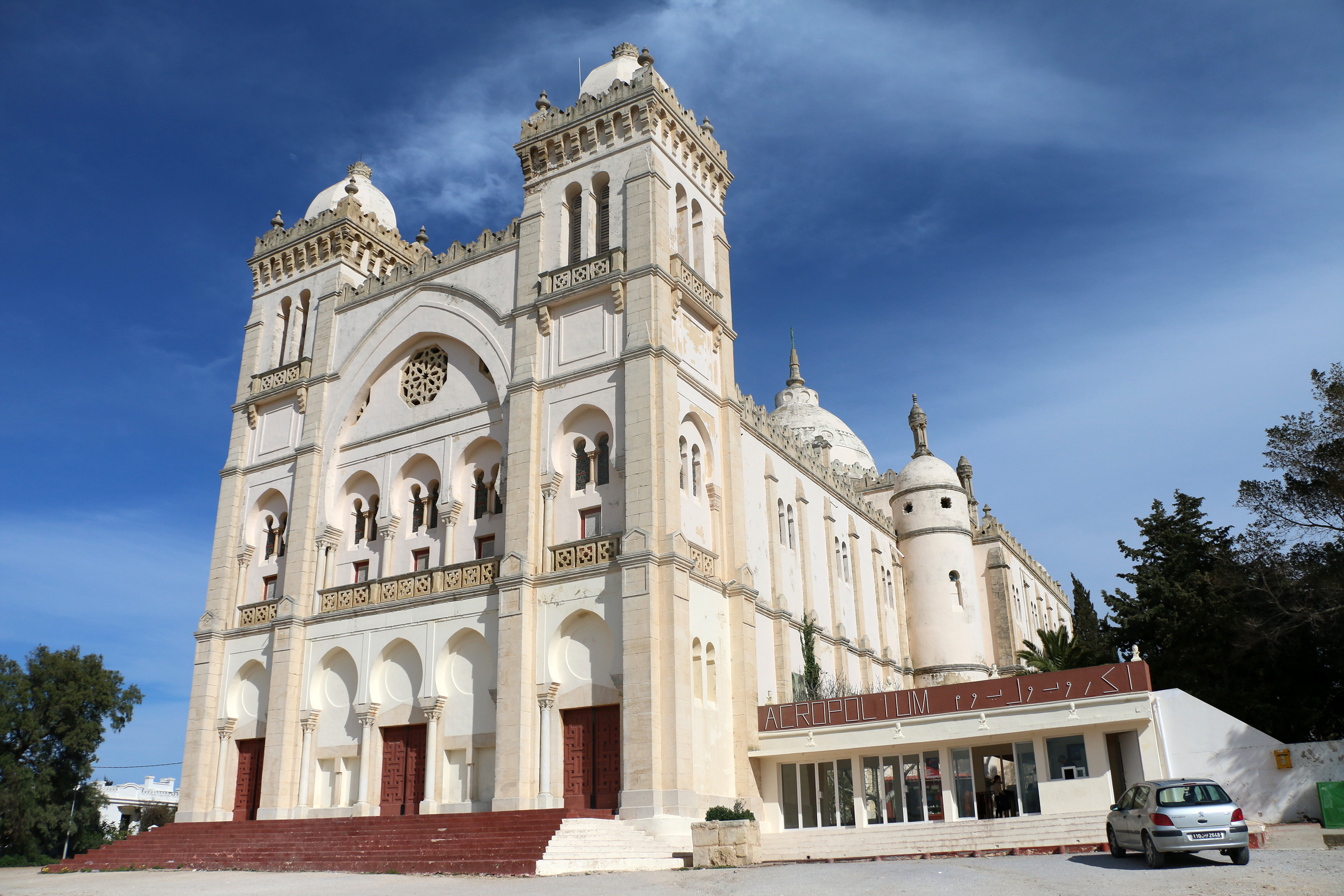
Cathedral Saint-Louis of Carthage.

Local Catholicism came under pressure when the Muslim fundamentalist regimes of the Almoravids and especially the Almohads came into power, and the record shows persecutions and demands made of the local Christians of Tunis to convert to Islam. Reports still exist of Christian inhabitants and a bishop in the city of Kairouan around 1150 – a significant report, since this city was founded by Arab Muslims around 680 as their administrative center after their conquest. A letter from the 14th century shows that there were still four bishoprics left in North Africa, admittedly a sharp decline from the more than four hundred bishoprics in existence at the time of the Arab conquest. The Almohad Abd al-Mu'min forced the Christians and Jews of Tunis to convert in 1159. Ibn Khaldun hinted at a native Christian community in 14th century in the villages of Nefzaoua, south-west of Tozeur. They paid the jizyah and had some people of Frankish descent among them. Berber Christians continued to live in Tunis and Nefzaoua in the south of Tunisia until the early 15th century, and "[i]n the first quarter of the fifteenth century, we even read that the native Christians of Tunis, though much assimilated, extended their church, perhaps because the last of the persecuted Christians from all over the Maghreb had gathered there."

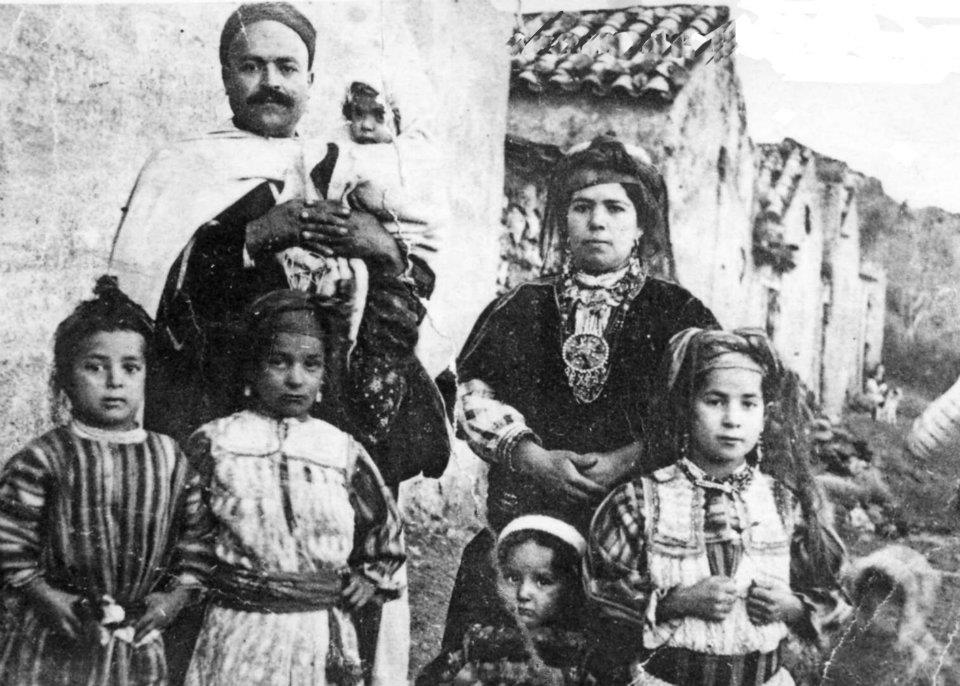
Christian Berber family from Kabylia.

Another group of Christians who came to North Africa after being deported from Islamic Spain were called the Mozarabs. They were recognised as forming the Moroccan Church by Pope Innocent IV.

Another phase of Christianity in Africa began with the arrival of the Portuguese in the 15th century. After the end of Reconquista, the Christian Portuguese and Spanish captured many ports in North Africa.

In June 1225, Honorius III issued the bull Vineae Domini custodes, which permitted two friars of the Dominican Order, named Dominic and Martin, to establish a mission in Morocco and look after the affairs of Christians there. The Bishop of Morocco, Lope Fernandez de Ain, was made the head of the Church of Africa, the only church officially allowed to preach in the continent, on 19 December 1246 by Pope Innocent IV. Innocent IV asked the emirs of Tunis, Ceuta and Bugia to permit Lope and Franciscian friars to look after the Christians in those regions. He thanked Caliph al-Sa'id for granting protection to the Christians and requested to allow them to create fortresses along the shores, but the Caliph rejected that request.

== Demographics ==
=== Maghreb ===
==== ِAlgeria ====
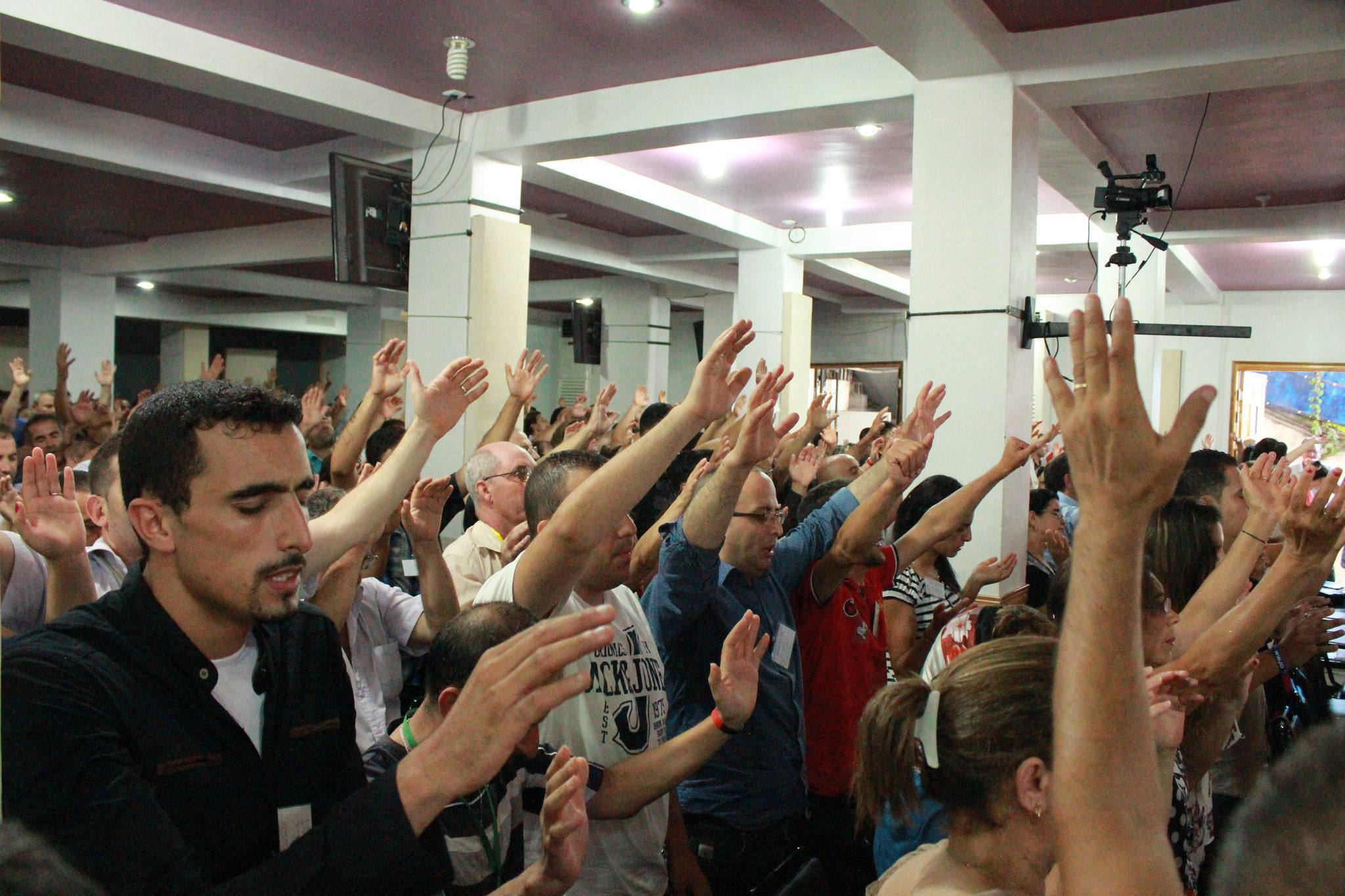
Kabyle Christians from Algeria.

Some reports indicate an increasing number of conversions to Christianity in Algeria, particularly in the Kabylie region and among the Berber. There are no precise figures on the number of Christians in Algeria due to the legal and social consequences of Muslims converting to Christianity. According to the 2013 International Religious Freedom Report, some Algerian Muslims who converted to Christianity have remained out of sight due to concerns for their personal safety, as well as potential legal and social issues. According to historian Daniel Pipes from Harvard University and the University of Chicago, there are "reports of widespread conversions from Islam to Christianity coming from diverse regions like Algeria, Albania, Syria, and Kurdistan". In northern Iraq and Algeria, the conversion rate among Kurds and Berber to Christianity has been unusually high.

According to the Unrepresented Nations and Peoples Organization, "since 2000, thousands of Algerian Muslims have converted to Christianity. Algerian officials estimate the number of Christians to be around 50,000, but others claim it could be twice that number". The Canadian Migration and Refugee Board estimates that "there are approximately 20,000 to 100,000 evangelical Christians in Algeria, practicing their faith in unregistered churches, mainly in the Kabylie region". Other reports suggest there may be over 100,000 Algerians who have converted to Christianity, particularly Protestantism. Conversions to Christianity have been more common in the Kabylie region, especially in Tizi Ouzou province, where the Christian population is estimated to be between 1% and 5%. A 2015 study published by the Baylor University Institute for Religious Studies estimates that between 1960 and 2015, the number of Muslims who converted to Christianity and Christians from a Muslim background in Algeria is around 380,000 people.

The Kabyle people are mainly Muslim, with a small Christian minority. Catholics of Kabyle background generally live in France. Recently, the Protestant community has had significant growth, particularly among Evangelical denominations. The Christian community among the Kabyle Berbers is estimated to number around 30,000 individuals.

==== Libya ====
A 2015 estimates some 1,500 Christian believers from a Muslim background residing in the Libya.

==== Morocco ====
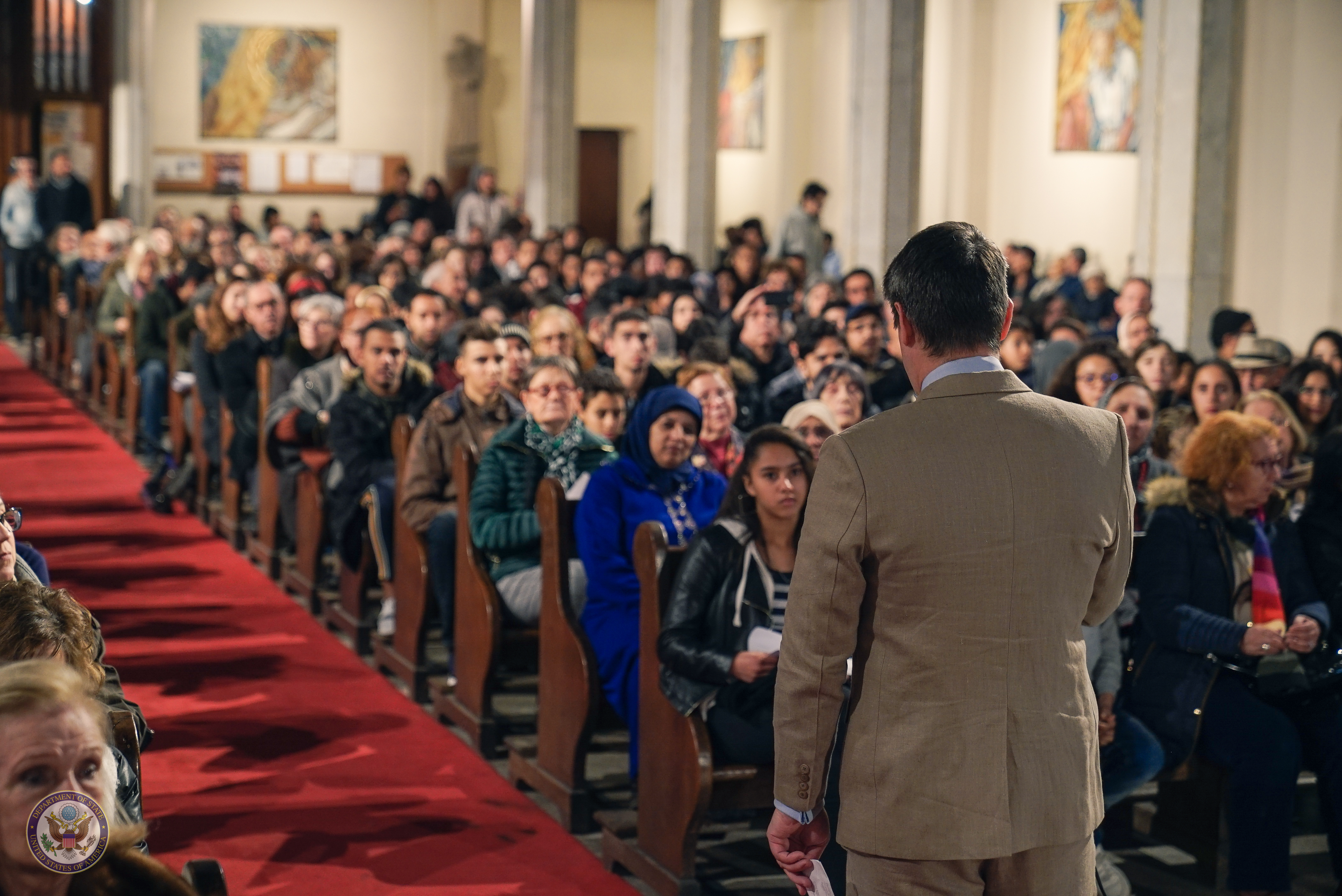
Attendees at a 2019 concert by Princeton University Choir at St. Peter's Cathedral, Rabat.

There are no official or unofficial statistics on the number of converts to Christianity in Morocco. Estimates in a 2015 U.S. State Department report suggest that between 2,000 and 50,000 Moroccans have converted to Christianity in recent years, most of whom are of Berber descent and are concentrated between Marrakesh and Agadir. "Vice News" estimated the number of converts at between 5,000 and 40,000 people. Several Moroccan reports, citing foreign reports, indicated that between 25,000 and 45,000 Moroccans had converted to Christianity in recent years. According to a 2018 report by Reuters and The New York Times, the number of local Christian Moroccans is estimated to exceed 50,000, though no official statistics exist. Other estimates suggest that around 150,000 Moroccans have converted to Christianity.

A report from the United Nations Human Rights Council published in November 2011 stated that between 2005 and 2010, approximately 5,000 Moroccan Muslims converted to Christianity (mostly ethnically Berber) who regularly attend "house" churches and live predominantly in the south. According to a study by the United States in collaboration with the U.S. embassy in Morocco, based on a public opinion survey, the number of Moroccans who converted to Christianity during the first quarter of 2012 reached 8,000 people. The Pew Research Center estimated the number of Christian Moroccans in 2010 at around 20,000. Moroccan Christians come from various cities and social backgrounds, with the largest group of converts being young people, in addition to whole families that have embraced Christianity.

There is no legal text in Morocco that prohibits the entry of the Bible into the country, but despite this, the state exercises strict control over Christian publications, especially those in Arabic. As a result, it is difficult to find a Bible in Arabic in Moroccan bookstores. To overcome this issue, Moroccan Christians translated the Bible into Moroccan Darija (dialect) and made it available online through the Bible Society of Morocco for anyone wishing to access it. Moroccan Christians have not only translated the Bible into Darija but also into other Berber dialects. Additionally, they have composed Christian hymns and religious songs in Moroccan dialect. Some Moroccan Christians have also created an online platform for the Moroccan church, bringing them together in the virtual world.

==== Tunisia ====
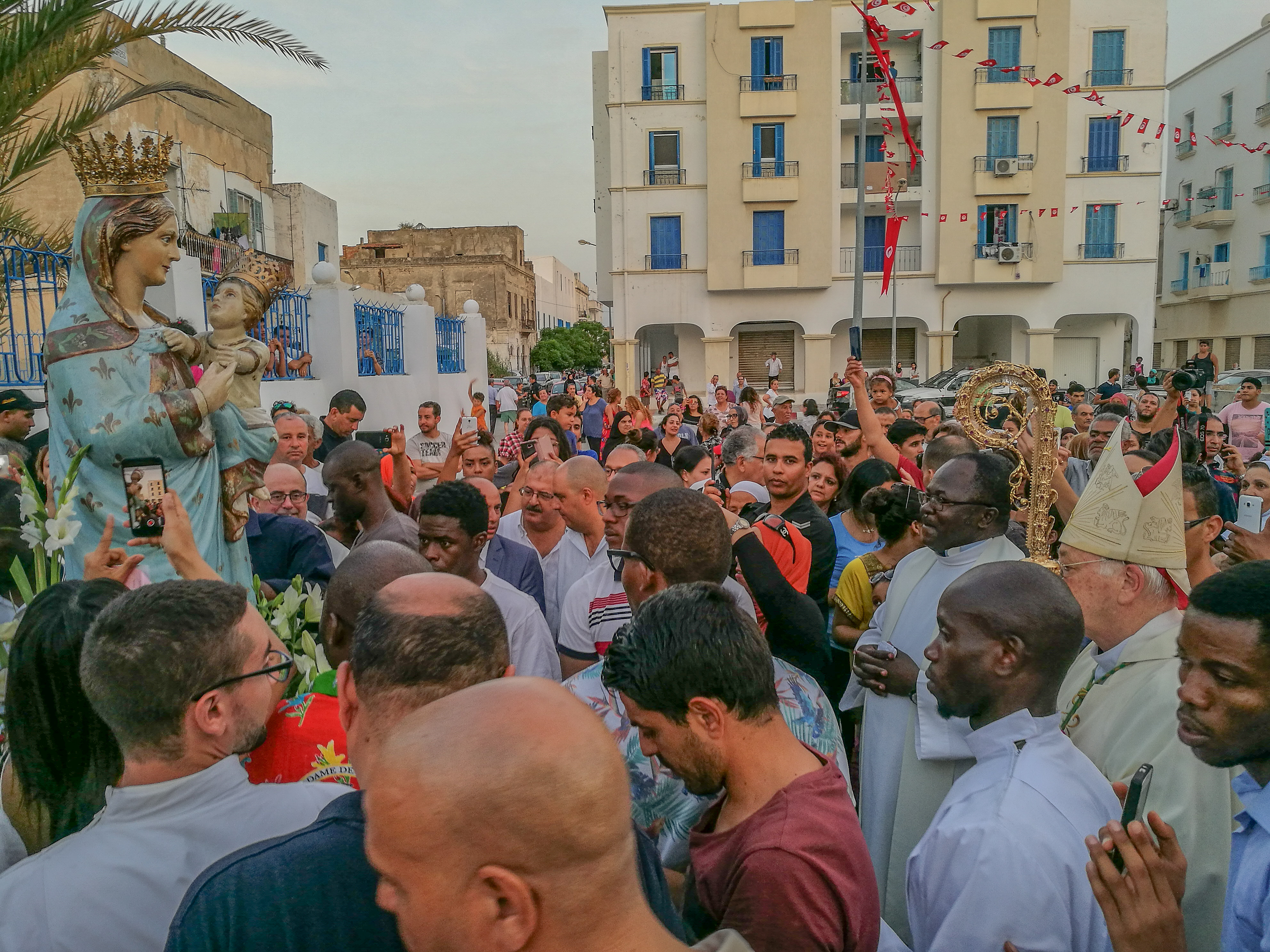
Our Lady of Trapani procession in La Goulette.

Christianity came in Tunisia during Roman rule. However, after the arrival of Islam, the population of Christians decreased in the country. Prior to Tunisian independence, Tunisia was home to 255,000 Christian Europeans (mostly of Italian and Maltese ancestry). The International Religious Freedom Report of 2007 reported that the Christian community numbered 50,000 people, 20,000 of whom were Catholics. In the Annuario Pontificio of 2018, the number of Catholics is estimated to have risen to 30,700. However, the number of Tunisian Christians is estimated to be around 23,500.

The Catholic Church in Tunisia operates 12 churches, nine schools and several libraries throughout the country. In addition to holding religious services, the Catholic Church opened a monastery, freely organized cultural activities, and performed charitable work throughout Tunisia. According to church leaders, there are 2,000 practicing Protestant Christians, most of them are Tunisians who converted to Christianity. There is also a small community of Jehovah's Witnesses numbering around 50, only half of which identify as Arab.

The number of Protestant Tunisians is estimated at 7,000, according to the U.S. State Department's 2018 report on religious freedom in Tunisia, which represents 41% of the total Christian population in the country. However, pastors of Protestant churches affirm that the actual number of Protestant Christians in Tunisia is much higher, reaching around 12,000, which constitutes 55% of the Christian population in the country. These individuals belong to various Protestant denominations, including Anglican, Methodist, Reformed, Presbyterian, and Baptist churches, in addition to many charismatic churches, most of which are Pentecostal. All of these churches are part of the Evangelical missionary movement, except for the Anglican Church, and are therefore referred to as Evangelical churches. Many of these Tunisian Protestants come from Berber backgrounds.

=== Berber diaspora ===
==== France ====
During the French colonial rule in Algeria, the country included local Christian communities of Berber or Arab descent, many of whom converted primarily during the modern era and under French colonization. Christianity was revived in Algeria in the 19th century with the arrival of Christian missionary missions, and a number of local Muslim inhabitants converted to Christianity, particularly in the Kabylie region. Among the Kabyle community in Algeria, a small but modern Christian minority emerged, including both Protestant and Catholic groups. Many of these local Christians in Algeria adopted French culture. It can be said that the number of Maghrebi Christians of Arab or Berber origin living in France exceeds the number living in North Africa, due to migration after independence in the 1960s. The number of Berber Christian diaspora in France was estimated by researcher Jacques Lanfray to be between 4,000 and 6,000 in 1955, while researcher Mark A. Lamport estimated it to be around 500,000 in 2018. Other estimates suggest that the number of Berber Christian minorities in France ranges between 40,000 and 60,000.

According to the national survey conducted in 2020 by INSEE, 64% of the French of Algerian origin who were surveyed identified as Muslim. At the same time, 4% of the French of Algerian origin adhered to Christianity, with 3% identifying as Catholics and 1% as other Christians (without further specification). Additionally, the same study found that 5% of the French of Moroccan and Tunisian origin adhered to Christianity, with 3% being Catholics and 2% identifying as other Christians (again, without further specification). These figures include Maghrebi French individuals of both Arab and Berber backgrounds.

== Saints ==
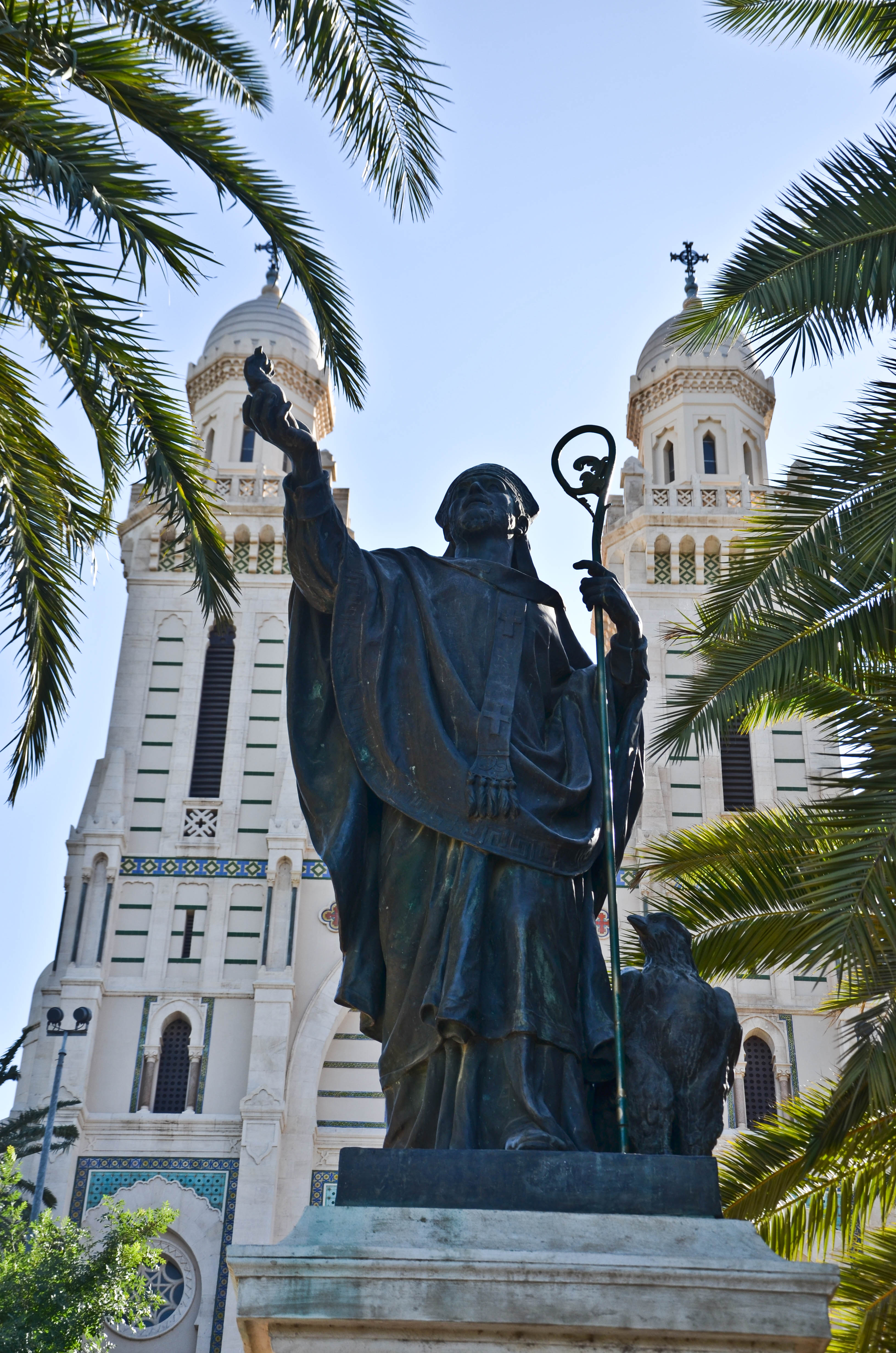
Augustine of Hippo

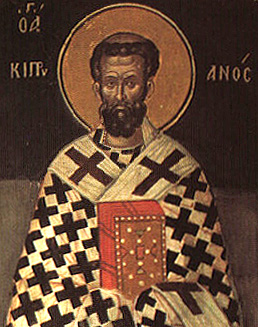
Cyprian of Carthage

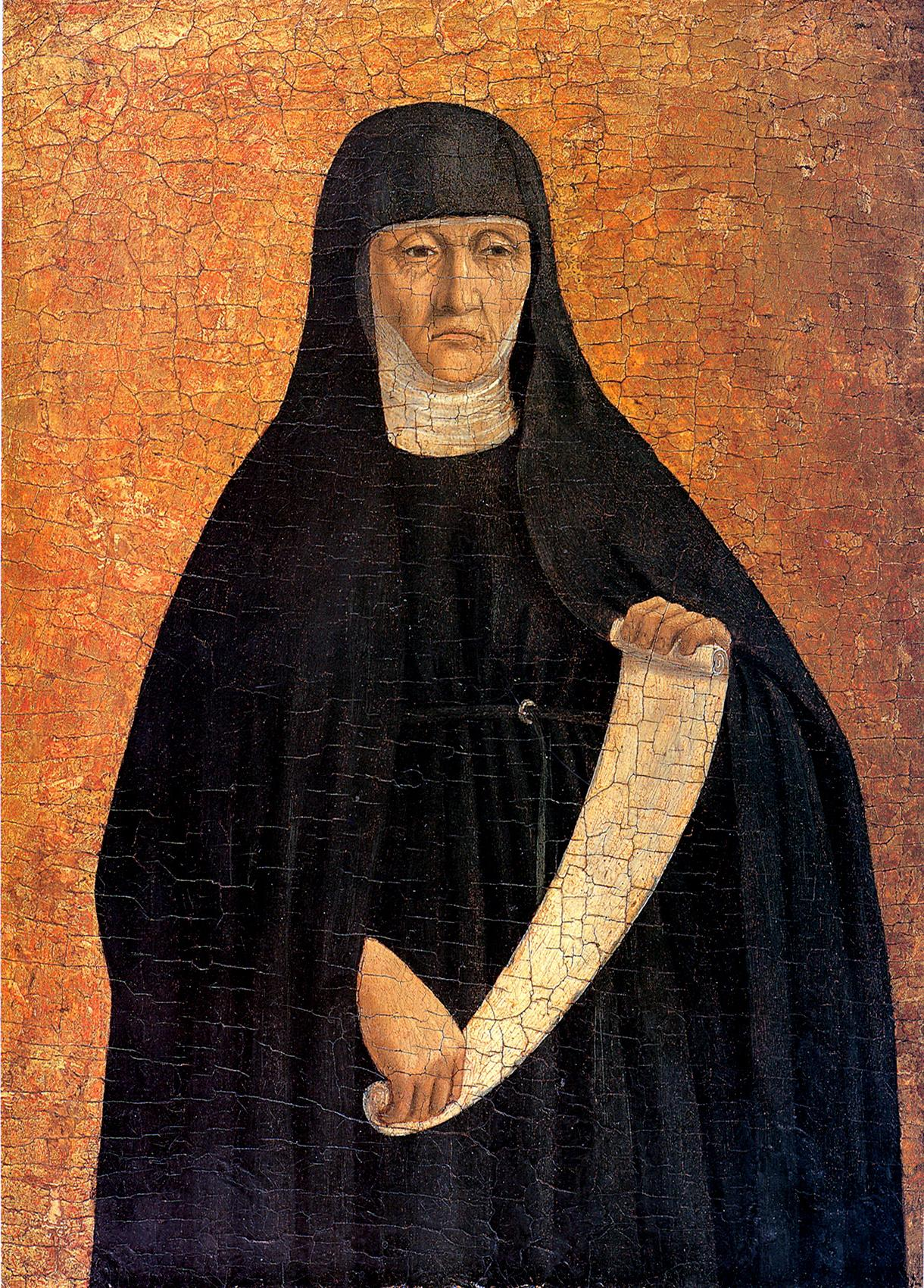
Saint Monica

== See also ==
- Archdiocese of Carthage
- Christianity in the Roman Africa province
- Muslim conquest of the Maghreb

== Sources ==
- Kirsch, Johann Peter (1913). "Miltiades, Pope St.". In Herbermann, Charles G.; Pace, Edward A.; Pallen, Condé B.; Shahan, Thomas J.; Wyne, John J. (eds.). The Catholic Encyclopedia. Vol. 10. New York: Encyclopedia Press, Inc.
- Hollingworth, Miles (2013). Saint Augustine of Hippo: An Intellectual Biography. Oxford University Press. ISBN 978-0-19-986159-0.
- Leith, John H. (1990). From Generation to Generation: The Renewal of the Church According to Its Own Theology and Practice. Westminster John Knox Press. ISBN 978-0-664-25122-2.
