= Unnamed Mauro-Roman Kings =

Hypothetical ruler(s) of the Mauro-Roman Kingdom

Unknown
- Kings of Altava

Kings of the Mauro-Roman Kingdom (hypothetical)
- Reign: 578 onwards
- Predecessor: Garmul
- Successor: Sekerdid
- Died: 7th century
- Burial: Jedar F
- Religion: Christianity

The unnamed Mauro-Roman Kings are hypothetical rulers of the Mauro-Roman Kingdom in Mauretania Caesariensis during the late 6th or 7th century. Their existence has been proposed by the French historian and archaeologist Gabriel Camps, who attributed the construction of the Jedar F, a monumental Berber mausoleum at Ternaten in present-day Algeria, to one of the successors of King Garmul.

Although no written source records the rulers' names, Camps considered the monument evidence that the royal dynasty survived beyond Garmul's defeat and death in 579, potentially continuing into the 7th century.

== Historical background ==
Garmul was a powerful Berber ruler who governed the Mauro-Roman Kingdom during the second half of the 6th century. He conducted several military campaigns against the Byzantine Empire, defeating Roman military commanders in North Africa before being defeated and killed by the Byzantine general Gennadius in 579.

The fate of his kingdom following his death is not recorded by contemporary written sources. No surviving literary account identifies his successor(s) or describes the subsequent political organisation of the kingdom.

== Possible succession ==
In his 1984 study, Rex gentium Maurorum et Romanorum, Gabriel Camps examined the possibility that the Mauro-Roman kingship continued after Garmul's death. He attributed the construction of Jedar F at Ternaten to Garmul or one of his successors, noting that its construction was considerably later than the end of the 5th century.

Camps based this chronological interpretation partly on the archaeological work of Fatima Kadra, who had identified Jedar F as the earliest of the monuments belonging to the Ternaten group. Camps argued that this chronology suggested the survival of the dynasty into the 7th century, when it would have experienced the Arab conquest of North Africa.

However, Camps did not establish the identity of the ruler(s) buried in Jedar F, nor did he demonstrate that this individual was Garmul or his immediate successor. The identification of the monument's occupant as a successor of Garmul therefore remains purely a historical hypothesis.

== Jedar F ==
Interior of Djeddar F, where Garmul or one of those rulers are said to have been buried

Jedar F is a monumental funerary structure located at Ternaten, on Djebel Araoui, near Frenda in present-day Tiaret Province, Algeria. It belongs to the group of monumental Berber tombs known as the Djedars, which are generally associated with the late Roman and early medieval period.

Its internal layout consists of two concentric square galleries providing access to eighteen chambers arranged around two central funerary spaces. An axial gallery, oriented east-west, leads toward the center, where the main chambers are covered by a vaulted ceiling. Inscribed blocks, voussoirs, and doorway elements from earlier structures have been reused within the building. Frescoes have also been noted in the central chambers, including a figure with a halo, dressed in a tunic and cloak and holding an object interpreted as a crozier, as well as a scene depicting two seated figures.

The monument is distinguished by its complex architectural arrangement, including galleries, chambers and a central funerary area. Its construction incorporates reused architectural materials, including elements originating from older Roman sites like an oppidum built by Septimius Severus (dated from 202 or 203) or Christian buildings.

Among the reused materials are Christian inscriptions dated to 433, 466, 480 and 490, providing chronological evidence for the earlier buildings from which they originated but do not directly establish the construction date of Djedar F itself.

"In room "b," above the entrance, one could discern a figure holding a crozier and wearing a red miter; he was dressed in red, blue, and white, and appears to have had a halo. In room "c," on the ledge to the right, the remains of a landscape were visible, in front of which two figures were conversing. R. de la Blanchère identifies in these paintings the style of the more recent catacombs."

Camps considered Jedar F particularly important for understanding the later history of the Mauro-Roman rulers, as its construction was attributed to Garmul or a successor of his.

He specifically says:

"Thirty years later, the king of the Moors (and of the Romans of Mauretania) was a certain Garmul, whom Jean de Biclar describes as a very powerful ruler who successively defeated the Prefect of Africa, Theodore (569), the magister militum Thevestinos, and in 571, another magister militum, Amalis. Garmul was defeated and killed in 579. It is to him, or to one of his successors, that we can attribute Djedar F, which appears to be the oldest structure in the Djebel Araoui, suggesting that the dynasty survived until the 7th century and had to endure the shock of the Arab conquest."

Based on this citation, it is heavily implied that whoever succeeded Garmul didn't survive the arab conquests.

== Other proofs ==
Camps also cites a line of tombstones in the Berber-Roman city of Volubilis dedicated to various leaders named Iulius and a woman named Iulia Rogatiana of Altava. The dating of the Jedars and the tombstones is unclear, and other scholars have proposed that the Jedars belonged to a different kingdom or an enemy tribe. Jean-Paul Laporte considers the Jedars to be the actual center of power in Mauretania at this time.

== Bibliography ==
- Camps, Gabriel (1984). "Rex gentium Maurorum et Romanorum. Recherches sur les royaumes de Maurétanie des VIe et VIIe siècles". Antiquités africaines, 20, pp. 183–218.
- Kadra, Fatima (1974). Les Djedars, monuments funéraires berbères de la région de Frenda. Doctoral thesis, Aix-en-Provence.
- Cadenat, Pierre (1957). "Vestiges paléochrétiens dans la région de Tiaret". Libyca. Archéologie, Épigraphie, 5, pp. 77–103.
- John of Biclaro, Chronicon, entry for 579.
