= Mauro-Roman Kingdom =

Early medieval Christian Romano-Berber state

Kingdom of Altava
- c. 429–599
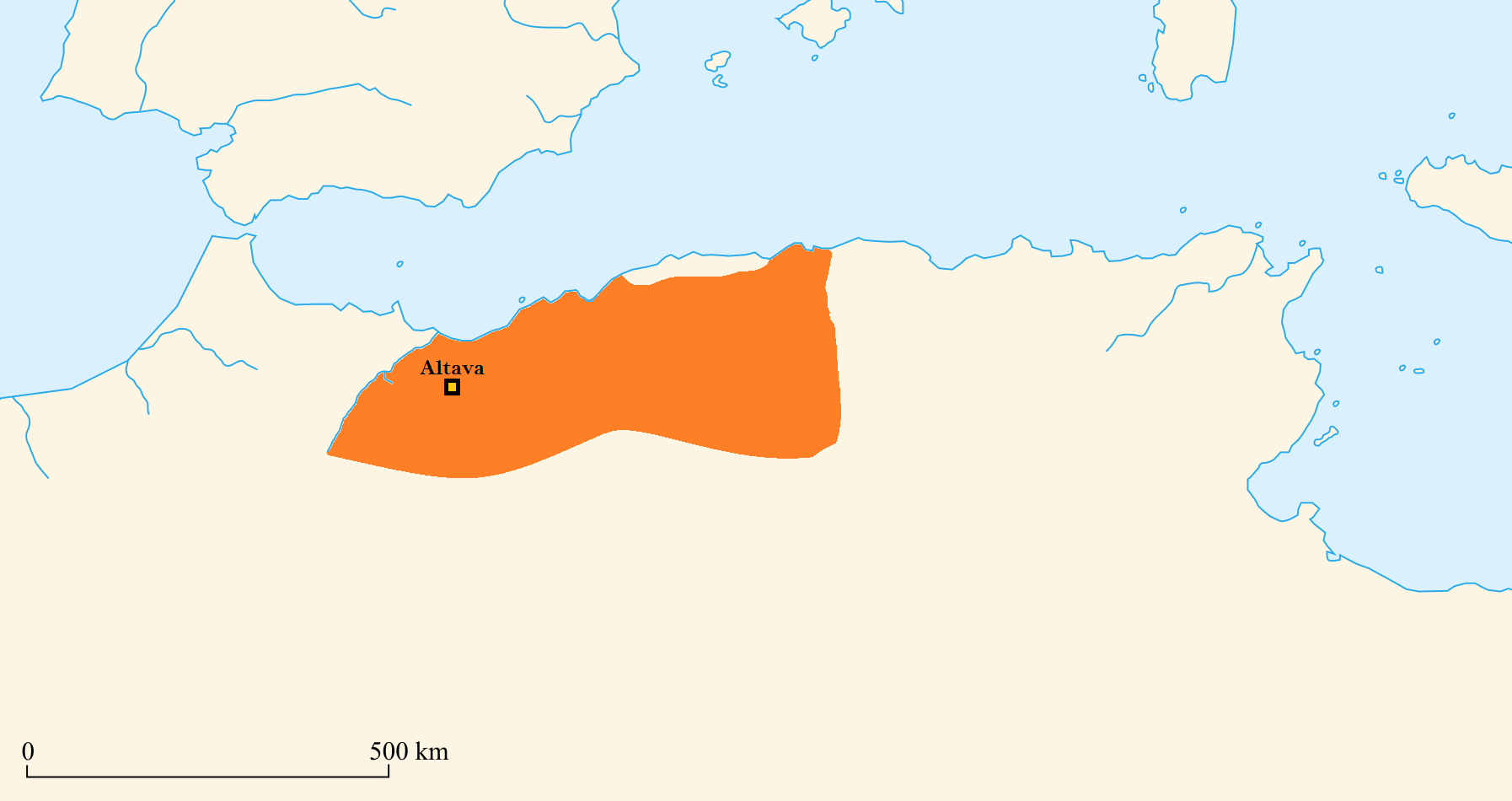
- The approximate extent of the Kingdom of Masuna
- Capital: Altava
- Common languages: Berber, African Romance
- Religion: Nicene Christianity then Chalcedonian Christianity
- Government: Monarchy
- King
  - c. 477: Mephanias (?)
  - c. 508: Masuna
  - c. 541: Mastigas
  - 541 – 545: Stotzas
  - 545 – 546: John
  - c. 570 – 578: Garmul
  - c. 578 – ?: Unnamed ruler(s) (?)
- Historical era: Late antiquity
  - Military independence from the Western Roman Empire: 429
  - Death of Gaiseric: 477
  - Decline: 599
Preceded by
| Western Roman Empire |
| Vandal Kingdom |
Succeeded by
| Byzantine Empire |
| Kingdom of Altava |
| Kingdom of Ouarsenis |
| Kingdom of Hodna |
- Today part of: Algeria; Morocco

The Kingdom of Masuna, also described as the Mauro-Roman kingdom of Altava, was a Christian Berber kingdom which dominated much of the ancient Roman province of Mauretania Caesariensis from the capital city of Altava (in present-day Algeria). Scholars are in disagreement about whether the polity aimed for independence as a kingdom or was part of a loose confederation, an alternative hypothesis drawn from contextual knowledge about Berber tribal alliances. In the fifth century, Roman control over the province weakened and Imperial resources had to be concentrated elsewhere, notably in defending Roman Italy itself from invading Germanic tribes. Moors and Romans in Mauretania came to operate independently from the Empire. However, regional leaders may not have necessarily felt abandoned by the Romans.

The rulers of this region repeatedly came into conflict with the Vandals of the neighboring Vandalic Kingdom, which had been established following the Vandalic conquest of the Roman province of Africa. The founder of the polity, Masuna, allied with the armies of the Eastern Roman Empire during their reconquest of Northern Africa in the Vandalic War. Following the Eastern Roman victory over the Vandals, local leaders maintained their alliance with the Eastern Roman Empire, assisting it in wars against invading Berbers of other tribes and kingdoms, such as the Kingdom of the Aurès.

Eventually, the diplomatic ties between the Eastern Roman Empire and the Altava polity broke down. The military leader Garmul, whom some historians identify as a successor king to Masuna's state, invaded the Eastern Roman Praetorian Prefecture of Africa in an attempt at capturing Roman territories. The smaller Kingdom of Altava has been proposed as a continuation of Masuna's state. Altava and surrounding kingdoms continued to rule over the Maghreb until the conquest of the region by the Umayyad Caliphate in the seventh and eighth centuries.

== History ==
=== Background ===
The province of Mauretania Caesariensis within the Roman Empire.

Mauretania and western Numidia, previously a Roman client kingdom, were fully annexed by the Roman Empire in 40 AD and divided into two provinces under Emperor Claudius; Mauretania Tingitana ("Tangerine Mauretania") and Mauretania Caesariensis ("Caesarian Mauretania"), with the separating border designated as Moulouya River.

Northern Africa was not as well-defended as frontiers that saw frequent attacks, such as those against Germania and Persia, but the economic importance of the African provinces made them important to retain. To this end, defensive structures were constructed alongside their borders, such as the Fossatum Africae; a 750 km long linear defensive structure composed of ditches, stone walls and other fortifications. This structure remained in consistent use until the Vandal conquest of the province of Africa. The Mauretanian frontier, not as well defended as that of the African frontier, was known as the Limes Mauretaniae.

The fifth century saw the collapse and fall of the Western Roman Empire. The inland territories of Mauretania had already been under Berber control since the fourth century, with direct Roman rule confined to coastal cities such as Septem in Mauretania Tingitana ("Tangerine Mauretania") and Caesarea in Mauretania Caesariensis ("Caesarian Mauretania"). The Berber rulers of the inland territories maintained a degree of Roman culture, including the local cities and settlements, and often nominally acknowledged the suzerainty of the Roman Emperors.

As barbarian incursions became more common even in previously secure provinces such as Italy, the Western Roman military became increasingly occupied to defend territories in the northern parts of the Empire. Even the vital Rhine frontier against Germania had been stripped of troops in order to organize a defense against a Visigothic army invading Italy under Alaric. The undermanned frontier allowed several tribes, such as the Vandals, Alans and Suebi, to cross the Rhine in 406 AD and invade Roman territory.

In Mauretania, local Berber leaders and tribes had long been integrated into the imperial system as allies, foederati and frontier commanders and as Roman control weakened, they established their own kingdoms and polities in the region. The presence of romanized communities along the frontier regions of the provinces meant that the Berber chieftains had some experience in governing populations composed of both Berbers and Romans. Following the final collapse of the Western Roman Empire, the state grew into a fully-fledged Barbarian kingdom not entirely unlike those that had sprung up in other parts of the former Empire. Though most other Barbarian kingdoms, such as those of the Visigoths and Vandals, were fully within the borders of the former Roman Empire, the state extended beyond the formal imperial frontier, also encompassing Berber territories never controlled by the Romans.

According to the Eastern Roman historian Procopius, the Moors only began to truly expand and consolidate their power following the death of the powerful Vandal king Gaiseric in 477 AD, after which they won many victories against the Vandal kingdom and established more or less full control over the former province of Mauretania. Having feared Gaiseric, the Moors under Vandal control revolted against his successor Huneric following his attempt to convert them to Arian Christianity and the harsh punishments incurred on those who did not convert. In the Aurès Mountains, this led to the foundation of the independent Kingdom of the Aurès, which was fully independent by the time of Huneric's death in 484 AD and never came under Vandal rule again. Under the rule of Huneric's successors Gunthamund and Thrasamund, the wars between the Berbers and the Vandals continued. During Thrasamund's reign, the Vandals suffered a disastrous defeat at the hands of a Berber king ruling the city Tripolis, named Cabaon, who almost completely destroyed a Vandal army that had been sent to subjugate the city.

=== "King of the Moors and Romans" ===
One of the Berber rulers of Mauretania, Masuna, titled himself as Rex gentium Maurorum et Romanorum, which may be translated as either "king of the people of Mauri and of the Romans" or as "king of the Mauri and Roman peoples". Although many Berber warlords had employed the term rex or "king" to describe themselves, the full inscription on which this title is found suggests grander ambitions, the scope of which has been debated by historians. Masuna may have considered himself the chief of a loose confederation, or the founder of a kingdom uniting specific ethnicities. For Greg Fisher and Alexander Drost, the historical context of Rome's loss of control over North Africa suggests that the Latin term rex was neither a full acceptance of Roman imperial command nor a challenge to it, but an expression of tribal identification within Romanized language and culture.

This unique inscription is located on a fortification in Altava (modern Ouled Mimoun, in the region of Tlemcen), dated 508 AD. It states that Masuna possesses Altava and at least two other cities, Castra Severiana and Safar, as mentioned is made of officials he appointed there. As the seat of an ecclesiarch diocese (the diocese of Castra Severiana, an ancient bishopric which flourished during Late Antiquity), the control of Castra Severiana may have been particularly important.

In full, the inscription reads: "Pro sal(ute) et incol(umitate) reg(is) Masunae gent(ium) Maur(orum) et Romanor(um) castrum edific(atum) a Masgivini pref(ecto) de Safar. Lidir proc(uratore) castra Severian(a) quem Masuna Altava posuit, et Maxim(us) pr(ocurator) Alt(ava) prefec(it). P(ositum) p(rovinciae) CCCLXVIIII". ("For the health and safety of king Masuna and of the Mauri and Roman peoples, the Castra was built by Masgiven, prefect of Safar, Lidir, procurator of Castra Severiana, whom Masuna installed at Altava and Maximus, procurator of Altava, appointed to command). This was installed in year 369 of the province") The three officials appointed are Masgiven (prefect of Safar), Lidir (procurator of Castra Severiana) and Maximus (procurator of Altava). The "year of the province," was counted from the date when the province was established, so the inscription dates to 508 AD.

The historian Alan Rushworth has proposed that Masuna indeed possessed a kingdom centered at the inscription's location in Altava. In contrast, Jean-Paul Laporte believes that while there were "kings of the Moors and Romans" alive at this time, the inscription is insufficient to conclude that Masuna was actually among them. Andy Merrills rejects the idea that "any one individual or family enjoyed a monopoly over military power", and suggests that Masuna was part of a larger confederation and that he adopted the title to indicate the prestige accumulated by his construction of a castrum.

The name Masuna gives to his polity identifies it as being on the territorial interface of two distinct populations, the coastal and settled provincial Romani (Romans) and the tribal Mauri (Moors, or Berbers) situated around and beyond the former Roman frontier. Devolution policies enacted by the Romans in the fifth century would have prepared local rulers for this type of dual rule. The citizens of the Roman cities were subjects of a formal and organized administration headed by appointed officials, such as those appointed by Masuna. The military manpower was derived from the Berber tribes over which control was maintained through the control of key individuals, such as tribal leaders, by issuing honors and estates to them. As Masuna's polity, like others in the region, adopted the military, religious and sociocultural organization of the Roman Empire, it continued to be fully within the Western Latin world. The administrative structure and titulature used by the rulers of the kingdom suggests a certain romanized political identity in the region.

This Roman political identity was maintained by other smaller Berber kingdoms in the region as well, such as in the Kingdom of the Aurès where King Masties claimed the title of Imperator during his rule around 516 AD, postulating that he had not broken trust with either his Berber or Roman subjects.

=== The Eastern Roman Empire and the Vandals ===
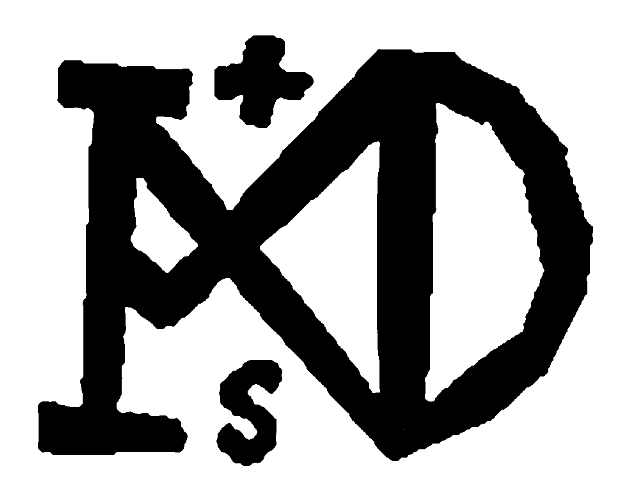
Monogram of Mastigas Dux.

Eastern Roman records referring to the Vandal Kingdom, which had occupied much of the old Roman province of Africa and coastal parts of Mauretania, often refer to it with regards to a trinity of peoples; Vandals, Alans and Moors, and though some Berbers had assisted the Vandals in their conquests in Africa, Berber expansionism for the most part, was focused against the Vandals and would lead to the expansion of the kingdom of Masuna and other Berber kingdoms of the region, such as the Kingdom of the Aurès.

A Berber king identified by the historian Procopius of the Eastern Roman Empire as Massonas allied with the forces of the Eastern Roman Empire in 535 AD against the Vandal Kingdom during the Vandalic War. Some writers have conflated Massonas with Masuna, but Gabriel Camps and other historians believe them to be separate people. When Belisarius and the Eastern Roman forces arrived in Northern Africa to invade and restore Roman rule over the region, local Berber rulers willingly submitted to Imperial rule, only demanding in return the symbols of their offices; a silver crown, a staff of silver gilt, a tunic and gilded boots. Essentially client kings, many of the Berber rulers proved recalcitrant. Those rulers that were not directly adjacent to Imperial territories were more or less independent, though nominally still Imperial subjects, and were treated with larger amounts of courtesy than the ones directly bordering the Empire, as to keep them in line.

Gelimer, the final Vandal king, attempted to recruit the Berber kingdoms to fight for him but very few Berber troops took part in fighting for the Vandal side. Though the Vandals had supplied the Berber kings with symbols of their offices similar to those supplied by the Romans, the Berber kings did not consider the Vandals to hold that power securely. During the Vandalic war, most Berber rulers waited out the conflict in order to avoid fighting for the losing side.

Following the Eastern Roman re-conquest of the Vandal Kingdom, the local governors began to experience problems with the local Berber tribes. The province of Byzacena was invaded and the local garrison, including the commanders Gainas and Rufinus, was defeated. The newly appointed Praetorian prefect of Africa, Solomon, waged several wars against these Berber tribes, leading an army of around 18,000 men into Byzacena. Solomon defeated them and returned to Carthage, though the Berbers later rose again and overran Byzacena. Solomon once again defeated them, this time decisively, scattering the Berber forces. Surviving Berber soldiers retreated into Numidia where they joined forces with Iabdas, King of the Aurès.

Masuna, allied with the Eastern Empire, and another Berber king, Ortaias (who ruled a kingdom in the former province of Mauretania Sitifensis), urged Solomon to pursue the enemy Berbers into Numidia, which he did. Solomon did not engage Iabdas in battle, however, distrusting the loyalty of his allies, and instead constructed a series of fortified posts along the roads linking Byzacena with Numidia.

Masuna was succeeded by Mastigas (also known as Mastinas) by 535 AD. Pierre Morizot identified Mastinas with Masties, the leader of the Kingdom of the Aurès mentioned above. Procopius states that Mastigas was a fully independent ruler who ruled almost the entire former province of Mauretania Caesariensis, except for the former provincial capital, Caesarea, which had been under control of the Vandals and was in Eastern Roman hands during his time. However, a coin attributed to Mastigas describes him as a dux, or Roman military commander. The rulers of Berber polities of this time period continued to regard themselves as subjects of the Eastern Roman Emperor in Constantinople. Even when they were at war with him or engaged in raids of Imperial territory, Berber rulers employed titles such as dux or rex.

=== Possible continuity ===
Pointing to the large group of dated Latin inscriptions at Altava and Tlemcen, Fisher and Drost suggest that "a political entity with some state-like features" originating with Masuna continued there until roughly 589–599.

Gabriel Camps identifies Garmul (also known as Garmules), a military leader who resisted Eastern Roman rule in Africa, as a later king who continued the maintenance of Masuna's kingdom. In the late 560s, Garmul launched raids into Roman territory, and although he failed to take any significant town, three successive generals, Praetorian prefect Theodore (in 570 AD) and the two magistri militum Theoctistus (in 570 AD) and Amabilis (in 571 AD), are recorded by the Visigoth historian John of Biclaro to have been killed by Garmul's forces. His activities, especially when regarded together with the simultaneous Visigoth attacks in Spania, presented a clear threat to the province's authorities. Garmul was not the leader of a mere semi-nomadic tribe, but of a fully-fledged barbarian kingdom, with a standing army. Thus, the new Eastern Roman emperor, Tiberius II Constantine, re-appointed Thomas as praetorian prefect of Africa, and the able general Gennadius was posted as magister militum with the clear aim of reducing Garmul's kingdom. Preparations were lengthy and careful, but the campaign itself, launched in 577–78 AD, was brief and effective, with Gennadius utilizing terror tactics against Garmul's subjects. Garmul was defeated and killed in 578 AD.

Although Garmul was defeated, Gabriel Camps suggests that the kingdom persisted until the Arab invasions of the 7th century. The rulers of the area after Garmul are unattested in historical sources, but they have been variously connected to a group of mausolea called Jedars located south of Tiaret, as well as to a line of tombstones in the Berber-Roman city of Volubilis dedicated to various leaders named Iulius and a woman named Iulia Rogatiana of Altava. The dating of the Jedars and the tombstones is unclear, and other scholars have proposed that the Jedars belonged to a different kingdom or an enemy tribe. Jean-Paul Laporte considers the Jedars to be the actual center of power in Mauretania at this time.

=== Incorporation? ===
So far it has not been clarified whether the Altava area or at least the coastal strip was incorporated into the Eastern Roman Empire. Only the expansion of Byzantine fortresses by Gennadius is discussed, but not their locations. In any case, the question of the incorporation of parts of the Kingdom of Altava into the Eastern Roman dominion has not yet been researched, which is why only arguments for or against the thesis can be used at the moment.

| No further expansion | Incorporation of the coastal areas | Conquest/subjugation of the entire territory |
|---|---|---|
| There are no sources about the construction of Byzantine fortresses.; The source situation regarding the conquest of areas of the Empire of Altava is poor.; No further fighting is known in this part of the Byzantine Maghreb. A connection to the formerly peaceful relations between the Roman-Berber Empire of Altava and the Eastern Roman Empire seems conceivable. Since the Eastern Roman Empire had been at war with Persia again since 572, a settlement seems likely in order to withdraw possible reinforcements back to the east, especially since the Persian Great King Khosrow I, who was fond of peace negotiations, died in 579.; The preservation of the Roman character, as with the cities further west, does not allow any conclusions to be drawn about the restoration of Roman rule. Close cultural and economic ties are also conceivable, especially as this was not uncommon in antiquity, even between states that were proven to exist. | The absence of Byzantine fortress ruins does not mean that Byzantine rule was absent. No ruined forts exist west of Setif and Tobna, although there is evidence of Byzantine rule extending further west on the coast beyond Caesarea.; Under the Eastern Roman emperors up to and including Maurice there was a claim to bring all former western Roman areas back under imperial control. This was also implemented in the realm of feasibility.; To rule the coastal strip, a strong fleet was needed, which the Byzantine Empire had at its disposal.; The continued existence of a larger Roman-Berber state would have remained a permanent threat and thus a source of further conflicts. This threat has been proven to be eliminated, for which a weakening was already sufficient.; − Nothing is reported about fighting from the other parts of the Byzantine Maghreb until the first Arab advance. | Gennadius had a large number of troops available for a complete elimination, which might even have been reinforced from the old empire. In addition, as can be seen, he was the focus of the emperor's troop reinforcements, which is all the more remarkable given that the Eastern Roman Empire was again at war with Persia at this time.; Judging by the extensive preparations, the campaign was surprisingly successful.; The information on the subsequent battles with the Berbers up to 584 show a temporal connection to the short, rapid campaign against the Altavian king Garmules and could refer to the elimination of pockets of resistance.; − Possibly, Gennadius will have been content with smashing the empire of Altava and having his supremacy recognized by the splinter states. |

== Legacy ==
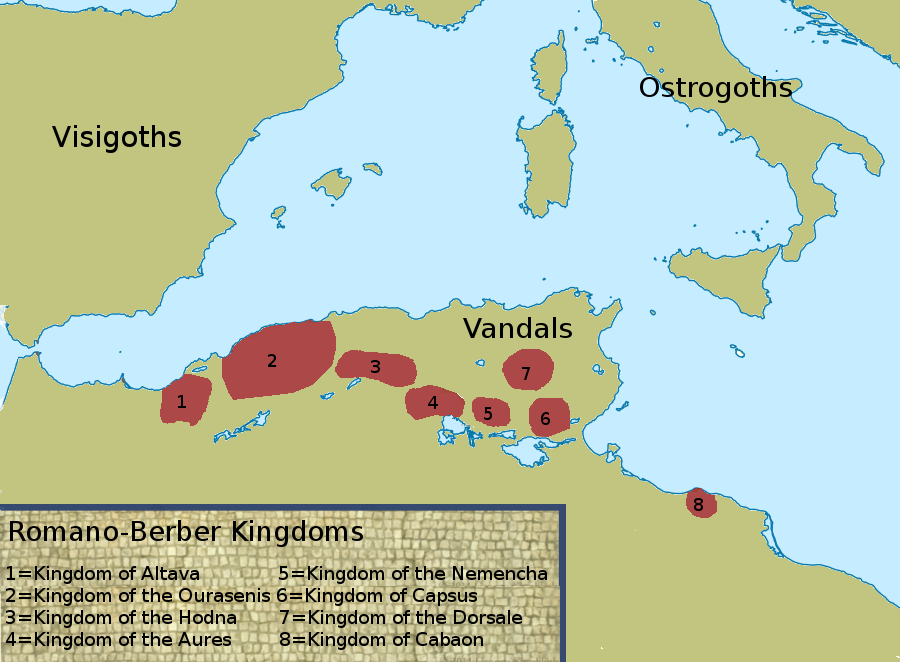
Map depicting later Romano-Berber Kingdoms of northern Africa, from left to right; Altava, Ouarsenis, Hodna, Aurès, Nemencha, Capsus, Dorsale and Cabaon.

Altava remained the capital of a romanized Berber kingdom, though the Kingdom of Altava was significantly smaller in size than the Kingdom of Masuna and Garmul had been. In the late fifth and early sixth century, Christianity grew to be the fully dominant religion in the Berber Altava kingdom, with syncretic influences from the traditional Berber religion. A new church was built in the capital Altava in this period. Altava and the other regional kingdoms, the Kingdom of Ouarsenis and the Kingdom of the Hodna, also saw an economic rise and the construction of several new churches and fortifications. Though the Eastern Roman Praetorian Prefecture of Africa and the later Exarchate of Africa saw some further Berber rebellions, these were put down and many Berber tribes were accepted as foederati, as they had been many times in the past.

The last known romanized Berber King to rule from Altava was Kusaila. He died in the year 690 AD fighting against the Muslim conquest of the Maghreb. He was also leader of the Awraba tribe of the Berbers and possibly Christian head of the Sanhaja confederation. He is known for having led an effective Berber martial resistance against the Umayyad Caliphate's conquest of the Maghreb in the 680s. In 683 AD Uqba ibn Nafi was ambushed and killed in the Battle of Vescera near Biskra by Kusaila, who forced all Arabs to evacuate their just founded Kairouan and withdraw to Cyrenaica. But in 688 AD Arab reinforcements from Abd al-Malik ibn Marwan arrived under Zuhair ibn Kays. Kusaila met them in 690 AD, with the support of Eastern Roman troops, at the Battle of Mamma. Vastly outnumbered, the Awraba and Romans were defeated and Kusaila was killed.

With the death of Kusaila, the torch of resistance passed to a tribe known as the Jerawa tribe, who had their home in the Aurès Mountains: his Christian Berber troops after his death fought later under Kahina, the queen of the Kingdom of the Aurès and the last ruler of the romanized Berbers.

== List of proposed Mauro-Roman kings of Altava ==
| Monarch | Reign | Notes |
|---|---|---|
| Unknown ruler(s) | | No one in this region claimed to be rex before Masuna. |
| Masuna | c. 508 | Described himself as rex. May be the same person as the military leader Massonas, who allied with the Eastern Roman Empire against the Vandal Kingdom and later against a Berber alliance gathered by the Kingdom of the Aurès. |
| Mastigas | c. 541 | Also known as Mastinas. Described himself as dux. Controlled virtually the entire ancient province of Mauretania Caesariensis, except for the old capital of Caesarea. |
| Unknown ruler(s) | | Gabriel Camps suggests that a kingdom continued after Mastigas, but does not supply any names before Garmul. |
| Garmul | c. 570–578 | Also known as Garmules. Invaded the Eastern Roman provinces in Northern Africa in the 570s. |
| Unnamed ruler(s) | | Possible later rulers can be seen in archaeological evidence. The state may have persisted to 589–599, or even longer. |

== See also ==
- Western Roman Empire
- Eastern Roman Empire
- Barbarian Kingdoms
- Byzantine North Africa
- Kingdom of Capsus
