= Romano-Berber kingdoms =

North African medieval polities

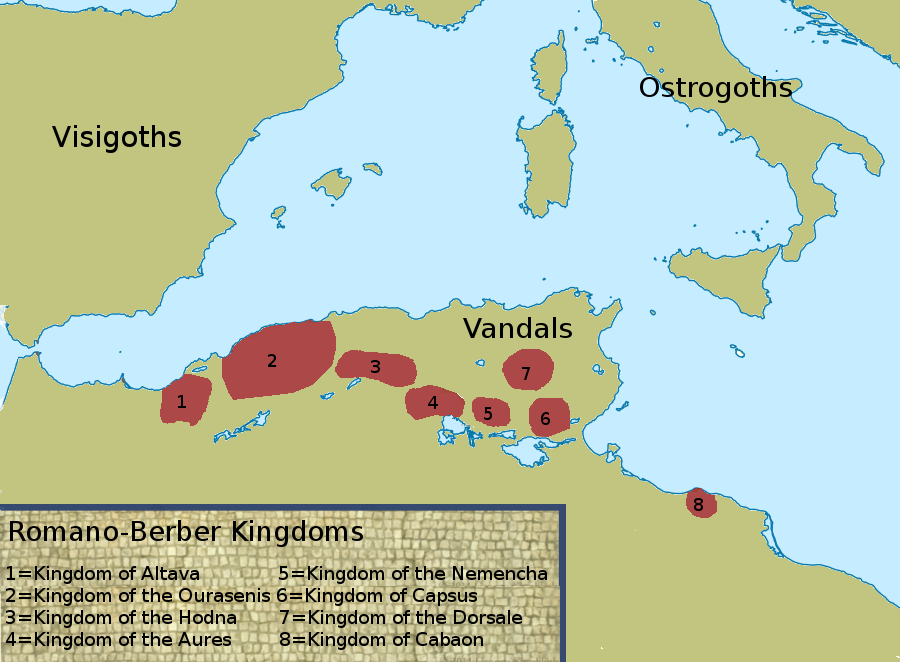
A map depicting eight historical and postulated Romano-Berber states during the late sixth and early seventh centuries.

The Romano-Berber kingdoms were a series of Christianized Romano-Berber states that existed during the sixth to eighth centuries in the region of Mauretania in territory that was formerly a part of Byzantine North Africa or Roman Africa prior to that.

The Romano-Berber kingdoms known to history or postulated include:

- Kingdom of Hodna (?–c.539)
- Kingdom of Ouarsenis (430–735)
- Kingdom of Masuna (477–599)
- Kingdom of the Aurès (484–703)
- Kingdom of the Dorsale (c.510–?)
- Kingdom of Altava (578–708)
- Kingdom of Cabaon (?) (Laguatan)
- Ucutumani Kingdom (?)
- Kingdom of the Nemencha (postulated)
- Kingdom of Capsus (postulated)
