= Jedars =

Berber mausoleums in Algeria

Djeddars
- Djeddars of Frenda
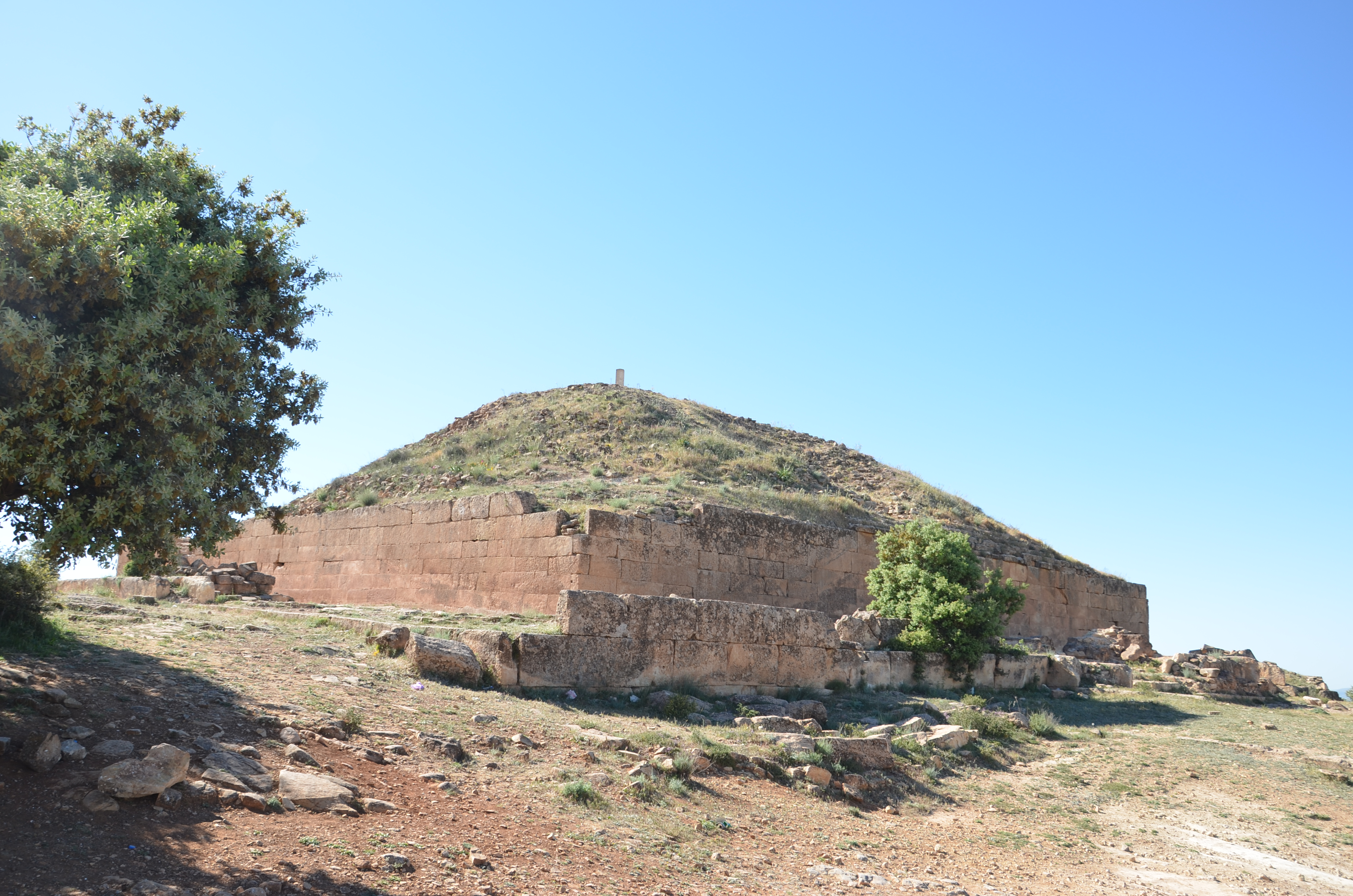
- Interactive map of Djeddars
- Periods: Late antiquity
- Cultures: Berber
- Associated with: Unknown

History
- Built: 4th–7th centuries CE

Site notes
- Archaeologists: Louis Siret
- Public access: Open to the public

Jedars (French spelling: Djeddars) are thirteen Berber mausoleums located south of Tiaret city in Algeria. The name is derived from the Arabic جدار (jidār, 'wall'), which is used locally to refer to ancient monumental ruins. The pre-Islamic tombs date from late antiquity (4th–7th? centuries CE). Some scholars, such as the French historian Christian Courtois, have associated them with the Romano-Berber Kingdom of Ouarsenis.

== Description ==
=== Construction ===
The tombs are situated on the tops of two hills in the mountainous Frenda area, around 30 km south of Tiaret. There are three sepulchres on Jabal Lakhdar (35.113098°N 1.212475°E), and ten on Jabal Arawi (35.063391°N 1.183733°E, also known as Ternaten) 6 km south of the first group. The graves' size and commanding situation indicate that they were built for royalty. They have been systematically plundered for many centuries, and hence are in a state of ruin.

The monuments were erected straight onto the substratum or with very shallow excavation. Some stone was quarried from local limestone and sandstone, some were recycled from nearby settlements and necropoli of earlier times. The materials vary widely: dressed stone blocks 1-1.5 m. long, partially dressed blocks up to 2.4 m. long, natural rock slabs with minimal dressing, old tombstones, and old building fragments. Most of the construction is dry stone; lime mortar is used sparingly.

The thirteen Jedars share many characteristics. There are also many similarities with much smaller Berber tombs called bazinas, which are common in the pre-Sahara zone. This shows that they represent indigenous Berber architecture in spite of their use of Roman architectural techniques and Mediterranean Christian iconography.

The characteristics are:

- A square body, the largest being 46 m. on a side, and the smallest 11.55 m., with a height of up to 4 m. In some cases, the body is solid stonework, in the largest examples it contains funerary chambers.
- A pyramidal top, which in all cases is very much ruined, but which must have been originally up to 13 m. high, constructed in many small steps (rise and tread about equal at around 0.2-0.25 m.). The top is mostly solid masonry, but in those jedars that contain funerary chambers, removable steps on one side conceal a passage leading down into the chambers, the ceilings of which may protrude up into the top.
- Most, perhaps all, were surrounded by a courtyard, square except for an extension in the middle of the side facing east. In the larger ones this extension contains a small building modeled after the main monument. This building is believed to have been used for obtaining divinatory dreams by sleeping in the vicinity of the tomb.
- Most if not all were further surrounded by a complex of low walls.

It is believed that the solid jedars that do not contain funerary chambers may cover a single tomb excavated into the bedrock.

=== Epigraphy and iconography ===
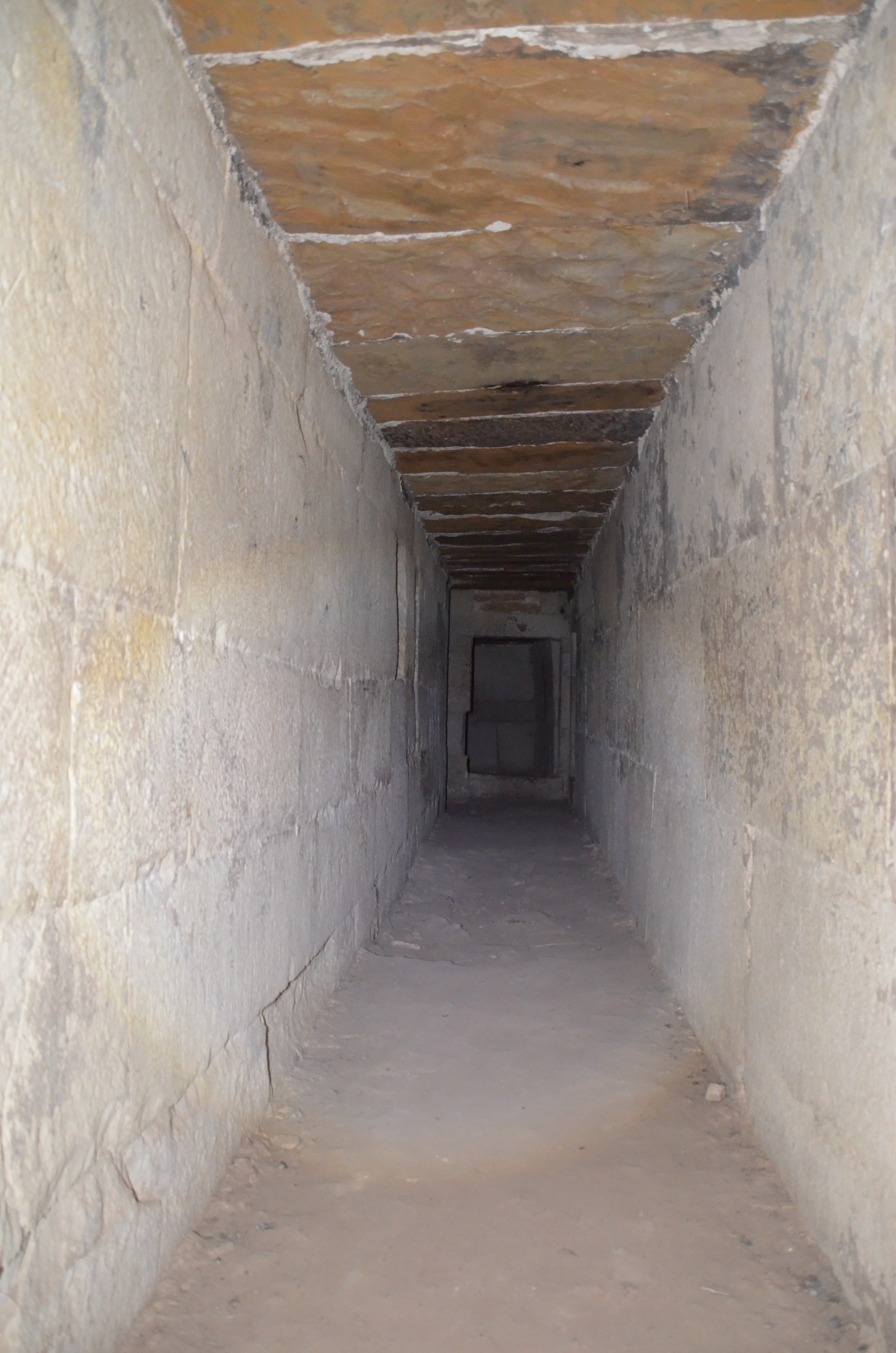

The jedars of Jabal Lakhdar seem to have displayed a dedicatory inscription on one side of the top. This inscription was in Latin, (Note: Early researchers, including the influential archaeologist Stéphane Gsell (1901), claimed they were bilingual Latin and Greek, which is occasionally repeated even today (e.g. Alan Rushworth, 2004, "From Arzuges to Rustamids: State Formation and Regional Identity in the Pre-Saharan Zone" in A.H. Merrills (ed.) Vandals, Romans and Berbers: New Perspectives on Late Antique North Africa; Guy Halsall, 2007, Barbarian Migrations and the Roman West 376-568). Kadra (1983), e.g. p. 257 & 261; see also LaPorte, 2005, p. 365) has shown that almost all the so-called Greek is based on erroneously identified late forms of Latin letters, while the remainder is merely the combination of Greek alpha and omega used as a Christian symbol rather than as text.) but not deeply engraved and hence in every case is now almost illegible; the inscribed blocks are also very damaged. Enough remains only to confirm that these were tombs, but not whose they were. (Note: Isolated words like egregius (eminent), duci (duke), filius (son) and matri (mother) can be made out.) However, these jedars display an enormous range of stonecutters' marks, from isolated letters to partial names. Most of these are also Latin, some have been postulated to be Tifinagh. There are a few unobtrusive Christian symbols, and a couple of roughly carved panels (apparently hunting scenes) similar to many ancient Lybico-Berber rock carvings.

The largest jedar at Ternaten is the only one in that group sufficiently intact to display epigraphy and iconography. It contained large well-executed polychrome murals (now almost completely weathered away) of religious scenes typical of Mediterranean Christian iconography of the 5th century or later, indicating that the ruling class had by then become Christian. This jedar also contains many Latin inscriptions on recycled tombstones and other building material, dating from the time of Septimius Severus (202-203 CE) up to 494 CE. The source of this recycled material is not known with certainty, but there are several large ruins of cities and necropoli in the surrounding districts. Judging by Roman milestones found in the district, there was a large city nearby, the name of which was abbreviated Cen, perhaps for Cenis.

=== Age ===
The three jedars of Jabal Lakhdar are believed to be the oldest. Within this group, the relative chronology is now believed known, from study of the stonemasons' marks. The largest, with funerary chambers, known as Jedar A, is the oldest; very soon after, solid Jedar B was constructed by many of the same workmen. The last jedar, C, is believed to have been incomplete when it was very hurriedly finished – perhaps the top was never finished – and its occupant interred, perhaps a generation later. Taking into account the unobtrusive nature of the Christian symbols, it is believed the occupants of these tombs were not themselves Christian but ruled over Christian subjects. Remains of a wooden coffin from Jedar B returned a C14 date of 410 ± 50 CE. (Note: Camps stated that this should be adjusted to 490 CE, a claim not repeated in his 1995 article.) Calibrating the date on the OxCal system gives a range of 410–615 AD at 95.4% probability. A recent re-reading of the dedication from Jedar A has proposed a 4th-century date.

The only jedar in the Ternaten group for which dating has been attempted is the largest, Jedar F. Because the latest recycled tombstone bears a date of 494, it may belong to the 6th or 7th century. Unlike the Jabal Lakhdar monuments, its funerary chambers seem to have been built to hold more than one occupant, so it has been proposed that it is dynastic, with the smaller jedars surrounding it those of lesser nobility or rank.

== History of research ==
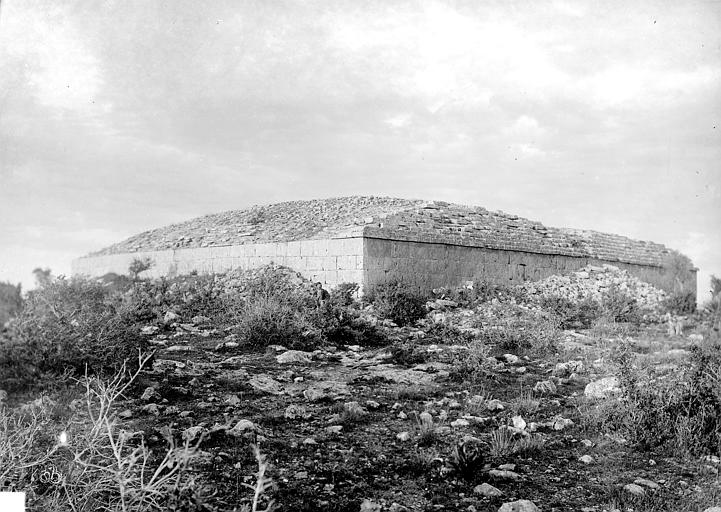
Jedars c. 1880

The earliest known reference to the jedars is in 947, when the Fatimid caliph Ismail al-Mansur was conducting military operations in the Tiaret area. According to a campaign diary that was copied by several later historians such as Idris Imad al-Din and Ibn Khaldun, the caliph was shown the jedars at Jabal Lakhdar and encountered an inscription "in the Roman language" (presumably in Greek, but also possibly in Latin). Inquiring as to its meaning, he was told that it read "I am the strategos Solomon. This city is called Mauretania. The inhabitants of this city have rebelled against the Emperor Justinian and his mother Theodora. Therefore he sent me against them, and I have built this building, so as to commemorate the victory which God has granted me". Although Ibn Khaldun lived in the area for a number of years, he made no other reference to the jedars.

Beginning in 1842, French military expeditions in the area noted the monuments, resulting in the first archaeological descriptions. Jedar A was opened in a very rough manner in 1875 by antiquarians who failed to publish their research. In 1882, Professor La Blanchère from Algiers University published a detailed study on the jedars (mostly based on the previous excavations) and attempted to place them in historical context. His identification of them as belonging to the Berber king Massonas mentioned by the 6th-century historian Procopius is not supported today.

In the early 1940s, an anthropology student, Dr. Roffo, obtained permission to excavate. In pursuance of this, he used explosives to open Jedar B, from which he obtained a skeleton which was in a wooden coffin in a tomb excavated beneath the building; the same happened with one of the smaller jedars at Ternaten. The whereabouts of these skeletons is unknown (they may lie unrecognised in an Algerian museum) and Dr. Roffo, it is said, burnt most of his notes in a fit of pique after an argument with the Director of Antiquities (who had probably got wind of his methods of 'excavation').

During the years 1968–70, an Algerian studying under Gabriel Camps at the University of Aix-Marseilles, Fatima Kadria Kadra, made the first archaeological study of the jedars to use systematic modern techniques. A book based on her thesis was published by Algiers University in 1983 and remains the definitive reference.

== Historical interpretation ==
The construction of the jedars is linked to the rise of a new elite that emerged during the disintegration of the Roman Empire in the 5th century. The names of the interred individuals and their association remain unknown, but they very likely belonged to a dynasty that used the mausolea not just as a resting place, but also an expression of power. It has been proposed that they were erected by Zenati-speaking migrants who, originating from the Sahara, overran the Limes Africanus and pushed into the Roman Maghreb in the early 5th century. These newcomers seem to have established one or several Romano-Berber kingdoms. Powerful Mauretanian individuals mentioned in written sources who are possibly to be attributed to these kingdoms and the jedars are Masuna (known from an inscription dated to 508 titling himself rex gentium Maurorum et Romanorum, "king of the Mauri and Romans"), Mastigas (fl. 535–539) and Garmul (fl. 569–579).

== See also ==
- Madghacen
- Tin Hinan Tomb
- List of cultural assets of Algeria

== Bibliography ==
- Cadenat, P. (1957), "Vestiges paléo-chrétiens dans la région de Tiaret", Libyca, vol. 5, pp. 77–103
- Gabriel Camps, 1995. "Djedar". Encyclopédie berbère, vol. 16, p. 2049-2422.
- Courtois, Christian (1955). Les Vandales et l'Afrique (in French). Paris: Arts et Métiers graphiques – via Internet Archive.
- Fentress, Elizabeth (February 14, 2019). "The Archaeological and Genetic Correlates of Amazigh Linguistics". In Gatto, M. C.; Mattingly, D. J.; Ray, N.; Sterry, M. (eds.). Burials, Migration and Identity in the Ancient Sahara and Beyond (1 ed.). Cambridge University Press. pp. 495–524. doi:10.1017/9781108634311.016. ISBN 978-1-108-63431-1.
- Stéphane Gsell, 1901. Les Monuments Antiques de l'Algérie, vol. 2. Service des Monuments Antiques de l'Algérie, Paris.
- Kadra, Fatima Kadria (1983). Les Djedars. Monuments funéraires Berbères de la région de Frenda (in French). Algiers: Office des Publications Universitaires.
- Claude Lepelley & Pierre Salama, 2006. "L’inscription inédite de la porte du Djedar A (Maurétanie Césarienne)". Bulletin de la Société nationale des Antiquaires de France, 2001 (2006), p. 240-251.
- LaPorte, Jean-Pierre (2005). "Les Djedars, monuments funéraires Berbères de la région de Tiaret et Frenda". Identités et Cultures dans l'Algérie Antique. University of Rouen. ISBN 2-87775-391-3.
- Nikolaus, Julia (2024). "Changing Funerary Landscapes in Late Antiquity: Mausolea in North Africa". In Lavan, Luke (ed.). Burial and Memorial in Late Antiquity. Volume 1: Thematic Perspectives. Late Antique Archaeology. Brill. ISBN 978-90-04-68795-0.
