= Sekerdid =

- King of the Awraba

King of Altava
- Reign: 605 – 678 (73 years)
- Predecessor: Last recorded previous ruler Garmul
- Successor: Kusaila
- Born: late 6th century, Byzantine Empire (likely)
- Died: 688 (aged 80+); Valley of Mamma, east of Timgad in the Aurès Mountains or before (Note: As said in the article, he apparently kept fighting alongside Kusaila after abdicating, making his death alongside him likely although he would have been more than 80 years old. It is either that or he died of old age at some point before 688.)
- Burial: Unknown
- Religion: Arian Christianity, Islam

Sekerdid, referred to as Sekerdid the Roman or Sekerdid al-Rumi was a Berber leader of apparently eastern roman descent mentioned as having led the Awraba tribe before and alongside Kusaila in the 7th century as well as ruling the Kingdom of Altava before him.
According to Ibn Khaldoun, he ruled his kingdom and tribe for 73 years until he seemingly abdicated in favor of Kusaila around the 670's.

Not all traditions present Sekerdid as solely Koceïla's predecessor. A later chronicle attributed to Bou Ras, describes the two men as contemporaries, with Sekerdid being presented as Koceïla's lieutenant during the battles against the Muslim armies which would mean he actually abdicated in his favor. This account also claims that both leaders embraced Islam before returning to Christianity, a version absent from the oldest sources.

As he fought alongside Kusaila, it is likely that he died alongside him at the Battle of Mamma although he would have been more than 80 years old.

In 688, following Kusaila's defeat the remaining members of the Awraba tribe converted to Islam. About a century after this, they were known for welcoming Idris I, an 'Alid refugee fleeing the 'Abbasids to the east, and helping him establish the Idrisid dynasty.
