= Burnus =

Burnus may refer to:

- burnūs, or burnous, a cloak worn in North Africa
- Burnus, one of the forefathers of the Baranis
- Burnus (Βοῦρνος), a place in Dalmatia mentioned by Procopius during the Gothic siege of Salona, probably the same as Burnum
