= Baranis =

Medieval Berber sub-group

al-Baranis (Arabic: البرنوصي, Al-Barnoussi), spelled sometimes as Barnès or Branes, are one of the two major groups to which Berbers (Amazigh) in the Maghreb and al-Andalus were divided by mediaeval genealogists and in some mediaeval Arabic sources, the other being called al-Butr.

The name al-Barānis is mentioned in the Kitāb Futūḥ of Ibn ʿAbd al-Ḥakam (d. 257/871). Despite being mentioned by medieval Arabic chroniclers, awareness about this ancestral identity has gradually vanished over the ages and is not very well known or shared among contemporary Berbers. The Barānis are, according to Ibn Khaldun, further divided into following main groups: Awraba, ʿAd̲j̲īsa, Azdād̲j̲a, Maṣmūda-G̲h̲umāra. Belonging of another three groups, such as Kutāma-Zawāwa, Ṣanhāja, Hawwāra is controversial.

The name Barānis is a plural form of their eponymous forefather, Burnus, who is described as son of Māzīgh b. Can‘ān, a legendary Berber ancestor. The place of origin of the Baranis is unknown, the first area, where the groups of Baranis are historically located, is the massif of Awrās in today’s Eastern Algeria, from where they started to migrate across North Africa at the time of Arab conquest in the 7th century. The powerful Baranis resisted the Arab invasions of Uqba ibn Nafi, allying with Kusaila and the Byzantines. After the Muslim conquest of Spain by the Umayyad Caliphate, many Baranis crossed the strait into Al-Andalus.

Ibn Khaldun considered the Baranis as sedentary people and the ancestors of sedentary Berbers, while the other group, the Butr, were considered the ancestors of nomadic Berbers.

== History of Baranis' sub-groups ==
The Awraba migrated from Awrās to northern parts of today’s Morocco, where they supported the foundation of Idrisid rule. The Ghumara settled in the Rif mountains, where they live to these days. The Azdadja have settled north of Tlemcen in today’s western Algeria and their chiefs controlled the area around the port of Wahran/Oran before the city was founded in the early 10th century.

The Ṣanhāja were a large group, the sedentary part of them is later known to live in the area of today's north-eastern Algeria. From among them came the Zirid dynasty, which ruled as governors of Ifrikiya for Fatimid caliphs, after the Fatimids moved their capital to Egypt. Another well-known dynasty of this branch of the Sanhaja were the Hammadids, who established their power as Zirid emirs, first in 987 in Ashir, and from 1007/1008 around Qalaat Beni Hammad.

The Kutāma also lived in north-eastern Algeria and were the principal pillar of Fatimid military power, especially in the beginnings of their caliphate.

During medieval period the awareness or claims of Baranis ancestry diminished and were overlayere [sic?]. In 1595-6, the Baranis are mentioned to have revolted against the Saadi Sultan of Morocco Ahmad al-Mansūr, but were mercilessly crushed.

Religiously, some of the Baranis were said to be Christian during the Arab conquest of North Africa, but by the 10th century they converted to Islam.
