= Altava =

Archaeological site in Algeria

- Altava was located between Rusadir (actual Melilla) and Oran

- Location within Algeria
- 34.886389°N 1.024722°W
- Location: Algeria
- Region: Tlemcen Province

Altava was an ancient Romano-Berber city in present-day Algeria. It served as the capital of the ancient Berber Kingdom of Altava. During the French presence, the town was called Lamoriciere. It was situated in the modern Ouled Mimoun near Tlemcen.

== History ==
Altava was located in western Mauretania Caesariensis on the Roman road from strategic Theveste to Numerus Syrorum (current Maghnia). Altava was a city populated mainly by Berbers under Septimius Severus, with a small Roman garrison. The garrison—according to historian M. Ruiu—was the Cohors II Sardorum and protected the new lines of the Roman empire moved south from the Mediterranean shores to a military road called Nova Praetentura. This road went from Rapidum in Numidia to Altava and Numerus Syrorum at the border of Mauretania Tingitana.

Altava, according to historian Lawless, was a vicus that achieved independent status from the castrum-fort of the garrison and had a huge Forum and an important pagan temple, later converted into a Christian church (showing the growing presence of Christianity in Roman Africa). The Roman settlement had an area of nearly 13 hectares and was surrounded by farms.

Emperor Diocletian reorganized the Roman Empire in 298 AD and later withdrew from the area of Volubilis, the Rif Mountains in northern Morocco and the western Algerian Atlas Mountains after the Crisis of the 3rd Century. Berber rulers created a small independent kingdom there, centered on the capital Altava and the fully Romanised city of Volubilis. From the 7th century Byzantine historians usually called it the Kingdom of Altava.

After the Vandal invasion in 429 AD, Altava became the capital of an independent Berber state. This Mauro-Roman kingdom was situated near Mauretania Caesariensis and Mauretania Tingitana, at some distance from the Vandal nucleus. Although a Berber polity, it borrowed the sociocultural, military and religious structure of the Roman Empire.

Between 550 and 578 AD, Altava served as the capital of the independent Christian Berber kingdom of Garmul.

The last time the kingdom of Altava was cited historically was in connection with a campaign of Gennadius, a magister militum sent by the Eastern Roman Empire. He defeated the Berbers and the ruler of Altava in 578 AD and his small kingdom was probably incorporated to the Byzantine Empire.

There are no historical records about Altava in the seventh century, but it is also conceivable that the kingdom of Altava (or at least a small section of it) lasted until its conquest by the Arabs around 700 AD.

== See also ==
- Mauretania Caesariensis
- Kingdom of Altava
- Rusadir
- Numerus Syrorum
- Rapidum
- Albulae
- Pomaria

== Bibliography ==
- Framing the Early Middle Ages: Europe and the Mediterranean, 400-800
- Bowna, Alan. The Cambridge Ancient History: Volume 12, The Crisis of Empire, AD 193-337. Cambridge university Press. Cambridge, 2005
- Conant, Jonathan (2004), "Literacy and Private Documentation in Vandal North Africa: The Case of the Albertini Tablets", Vandals, Romans and Berbers: New Perspectives on Late Antique North Africa, Ashgate Publishing, pp. 199–224, ISBN 0-7546-4145-7
- Lawless, R. Mauretania Caesartiensis: an archeological and geographical survey. Durham University. Durham, 1969 Altava
- Martindale, John R., ed. (1992). The Prosopography of the Later Roman Empire: Volume III, AD 527–641. Cambridge: Cambridge University Press. ISBN 0-521-20160-8.
- Ruiu, Maria Antonietta. La Cohors II Sardorum ad Altava (Ouled-Mimoun, Algeria). Universita' degli Studi di Sassari. Sassari, 2012
- Villaverde Noé, Vega. Tingitana en la antigüedad tardía, siglos III-VII: autoctonía y romanidad en el extremo occidente mediterráneo. Ed. Real Academia de la Historia. Madrid, 2001 ISBN 8489512949, 9788489512948
