= Kusaila =

7th-century Berber Christian ruler

- King of the Sanhaja; Leader of the Awreba
- Statue of Kusaila in El Hamma, Khenchela

King of Altava
- Reign: 678 – 688
- Predecessor: Sekerdid
- Successor: Unknown (Note: No successor is named after his defeat against Ummayad forces but someone must have ruled after him as his territory was only annexed in 708 AD)
- Died: 688; Valley of Mamma, east of Timgad in the Aurès Mountains
- Burial: Khenchela, Algeria
- Issue: Unnamed sons
- Berber: ⴰⴾⵙⵉⵍ (Aksil)
- Father: Lemzem
- Religion: Arian Christianity, Islam

Kusaila, also known as Aksel (in Tifinagh: ⴰⴾⵙⵉⵍ, Arabic: كسيلة بن ملزم, Kusayla), was a 7th-century Berber Christian ruler of the kingdom of Altava and leader of the Awraba tribe, a Christianised sedentary Berber tribe of the Aures and possibly Christian king of the Sanhaja. Under his rule his domain stretched from Volubilis in the west to the Aurès in the east and later Kairouan and the interior of Ifriqiya. Kusaila is mostly known for leading Berber forces against the Muslim conquest of the Maghreb in the 680s. In 683, he won a major victory at the Battle of Vescera, where the Umayyad commander Uqba ibn Nafi was killed. Kusaila was later defeated and killed at the Battle of Mamma in 688.

== Etymology ==
According to Gabriel Camps, the name Kusaila possibly originates from Caesilius (or its variant spellings such as Caecilian), a Roman name widely used among Christianized Berbers; however, this Latin hypothesis is considered fragile by historian Yves Modéran, as the name follows a perfectly admissible Berber consonantal structure (K-S-L) linked to the lexical root meaning "to remove" or "to gather," and is closely related to ancient, and contemporary Berber names like Aksil.

== Caecilius (King of Altava) ==
Initially the Berber States were able to defeat the Umayyads at the Battle of Vescera (modern Biskra in Algeria), that was fought in 682 AD between the Berbers of King Kusaila and their Byzantine allies from the Exarchate of Africa against an Umayyad army under Uqba ibn Nafi, the founder of Kairouan.

Uqba ibn Nafi had led his men in an invasion across North Africa, eventually reaching the Atlantic Ocean and marching as far south as the Draa and Sous rivers. On his return, he was met by the Berber-Byzantine coalition at Tahuda south of Vescera, his army was crushed and he himself was killed. As a result of this crushing defeat Kusaila took control of Byzacena and a large part of Ifriqiya, the Arabs lost all of their land in Africa west of Cyrenaica and were expelled from the area of modern Tunisia and eastern Algeria for more than a decade.

== Biography ==
His homeland was Tlemcen, now in Algeria, according to Ibn Khaldun. However, this account dates from the 14th century, some 700 years later. Indeed, Kusaila, according to historian Noe Villaverde, was probably a king of Altava. Other sources closer to Kusaila's time (ninth century is the earliest available) associate him only with the Aurès Mountains in Algeria. Kusaila grew up in Berber tribal territory during the time of the Byzantine exarchate.

Kusaila is speculated to be a Christian based on his Roman-sounding name. According to historian Gabriel Camps, his name was a possible translation in Berber of the Latin name "Caecilius", showing that he was from a noble Berber family. His name even intrigued Orientalists; unlike other Berber kings, like his predecessors Masuna, Masties, Mastigas and Garmul, Arab chroniclers likely transmitted us a name of another language: Latin Caecilius, a common name found in the graves of Volubilis.

He was captured by Uqba but in AD 683 he succeeded in escaping and raised against his tormentors a large force of Christian Berber and Byzantine soldiers. And attacked Uqba, killing him near Biskra. After Uqba's death his armies retreated from Kairouan, which Kusaila took as his capital, and for a while he seems to have been at least in name the master of all North Africa. But his respite from battle was to be short-lived. Five years later Kusaila was killed in battle against fresh Arab forces led by a Muslim general from Damascus. This soldier was himself ambushed and put to death by Byzantine sea-raiders shortly afterwards. For a while confusion reigned, but the Awraba recognized the weakness of their position and eventually capitulated to the newly re-organized and reinforced Arab army. With the death of Kusaila, the torch of resistance passed to a tribe known as the Jerawa, who had their home in the Aurès.

According to late Muslim accounts (11th century through to ibn Khaldun in the 14th century) the amir of the Muslim invaders, who was then a freed slave called Abu al-Muhajir Dinar, surprisingly invited Kusaila to meet with him in his camp. Abu al-Muhajir Dinar convinced him to accept Islam and join his army with a promise of full equality with the Arabs (678). Abu al-Muhajir was a master in diplomacy and thoroughly impressed Kusaila with not only his piety but with his high sense of respect and etiquette. Kusaila incorporated the Awraba-Sanhaja into the conquering Arab force and participated in their uniformly successful campaigns under Abu al-Muhajir.

This amir was then forcibly replaced by Uqba ibn Nafi, who treated Kusaila and his men with contempt. Eventually Uqba's disrespect enraged Kusaila and provoked a plot of revenge. On the army's return from Morocco, Uqba allowed his troops to break up and go home. The remainder, about 300, were vulnerable and exhausted. On the return march to Kairouan, Kusaila joined with the Byzantine forces and organised an ambush. The Christian-Berber force, about 5000 strong, defeated the Arabs and felled Uqba at Tahudha near Biskra in 683. Kusaila now held undisputed mastery over North Africa and marched to Kairouan in triumph.

The above account is disputed by some historians, who prefer the earlier 9th-century sources. According to these, Abu al-Muhajir had no connection with Kusaila, nor did Uqba ibn Nafi until he was ambushed at Tahudha. These earlier sources also describe Kusaila as a Christian, not a Muslim convert. They do agree, however, that he led a Berber force when he defeated Uqba.

In 687 AD Arab reinforcements arrived under Zuhayr ibn Qays. Kusaila met them in 688 AD at the Battle of Mamma. Vastly outnumbered, the Awraba were defeated and Kusaila was killed. In 693, Caliph Abd al-Malik ibn Marwan sent an army of 40,000 men commanded by Hassan ibn al-Nu'man to Cyrenaica and Tripolitania in order to remove the Byzantine threat to the Umayyads in North Africa. They met no rival groups until they reached Tunisia where they captured Carthage and defeated the Byzantines and Berbers around Bizerte. However, it was not the last instance of Berber resistance, since Kahina succeeded Kusaila as the war leader of the Berber tribes in the 680s.

== See also ==
- Kingdom of Altava
- Kahina
