= Kingdom of Ouarsenis =

Romano-Berber kingdom

- 430–735
- Map of the Romano-Berber Kingdoms, according to the French historian Christian Courtois.
- Status: Rump state of the Mauro-Roman Kingdom
- Capital: Tiaret
- Common languages: Berber, African Romance Latin
- Religion: Christianity
- Government: Monarchy
- King
- Historical era: Medieval
  - Collapse of the Mauro-Roman Kingdom: 430
  - Annexed by Umayyad Caliphate: 735
Preceded by	Succeeded by
Mauro-Roman Kingdom	Umayyad Caliphate
- Today part of: Algeria

The Kingdom of Ouarsenis (also known as the Kingdom of the Djeddars) is the name of a possible Romano-Berber kingdom located in what is present-day Algeria. The existence of the kingdom was proposed by the French historian Christian Courtois in his 1955 book Les Vandales Et L'Afrique, based on two comments made by the Eastern Roman historian Procopius and the existence of the Jedars. It is likely that this kingdom's capital city was Tiaret.

The existence of this kingdom is far from certain: The French archaeologist Gabriel Camps, for instance, has argued that Courtois' "Kingdom of Ouarsenis" was but a part of a larger kingdom that included most of Mauretania Caesariensis. Other scholars, such as those writing for the Encyclopédie berbère, have further questioned why Courtois dubbed it the "Kingdom of Ouarsenis" when the kingdom was likely centered not around the Ouarsenis, but instead the mountainous Frenda area.

== See also ==
- Mauro-Roman Kingdom
- Exarchate of Africa

== Bibliography ==
- Bacha, Dmoh (2019). Algerie Culture Identite: Maghreb Algerie Maroc Tunisie (in French). Illindi Publishing. p. 37. ISBN 978-1-0955-9126-0.
- Camps, Gabriel (1984). "Rex gentium Maurorum et Romanorum: Recherches sur les royaumes de Maurétanie des VIe et VIIe siècles". Antiquités Africaine (in French) (20): 183–218.
- Courtois, Christian (1955). Les Vandales et l'Afrique (in French). Paris: Arts et Métiers graphiques – via Internet Archive.
- Diehl, Charles (1896). L'Afrique Byzantine. Histoire de la Domination Byzantine en Afrique (533–709) (in French). Paris, France: Ernest Leroux.
- Halsall, Guy (2007). Barbarian Migrations and the Roman West, 376–568. Cambridge University Press. ISBN 9781107393325.
- Laporte, Jean-Pierre; et al. (1988). "Ouarsenis : Histoire, géographie humaine et société". Encyclopédie berbère (in French). International Union of Prehistoric and Protohistoric Sciences.
- Kennedy, Hugh N.; Bessard, Fanny (2024). Land and Trade in Early Islam: The Economy of the Islamic Middle East 750-1050 CE. Oxford University Press. ISBN 9780192608178.
- Modéran, Yves (2008). "Des Maures aux Berbères: Identite et ethnicité en Afrique du Nord". Identité et ethnicité : concepts, débats historiographiques, exemples (IIIe-XIIe siècle) (in French). Caen: Centre de Recherches Archéologiques et Historiques Anciennes et Médiévales. pp. 91–134.
- Conant, Jonathan (2012). Staying Roman: Conquest and identity in Africa and the Mediterranean, 439-700. Cambridge New York: Cambridge University Press. pp. 280–281. ISBN 978-0521196970.
