= Kingdom of Altava =

Kingdom in present-day Algeria

- 578–708
- Map of the Romano-Berber Kingdoms, according to the French historian Christian Courtois. The Kingdom of Altava is farthest to the left.
- Status: Rump state of the Mauro-Roman Kingdom
- Capital: Altava
- Common languages: Berber, African Romance Latin
- Religion: Christianity
- Government: Monarchy
- King
  - 578-670s: (Unknown)
  - 668-678: Sekerdid
  - 678-688: Caecilius
- Historical era: Medieval
  - Collapse of the Mauro-Roman Kingdom: 578
  - Annexed by Umayyad Caliphate: 708
Preceded by	Succeeded by
Mauro-Roman Kingdom	Umayyad Caliphate
- Today part of: Algeria; Tunisia

The Kingdom of Altava was an independent Christian Berber kingdom centered on the city of Altava in present-day northern Algeria. The Kingdom of Altava was a successor state of the previous Mauro-Roman Kingdom which had controlled much of the ancient Roman province of Mauretania Caesariensis. During the reign of Aksel, it extended from Volubilis in the west to the Aurès and later Kairaouan and the interior of Ifriqiya in the east. This Kingdom collapsed following Eastern Roman military campaigns to decrease its influence and power after Garmul invaded the Exarchate of Africa.

The collapse of the Mauro-Roman Kingdom lead to the rise of several petty berber kingdoms in the region, including the Kingdom of Altava, which was centered on the capital of the older kingdom. The kingdom continued to exist in the Maghreb until the conquest of the region by the Umayyad Caliphate in the seventh and eighth centuries.

== History ==
=== Background ===
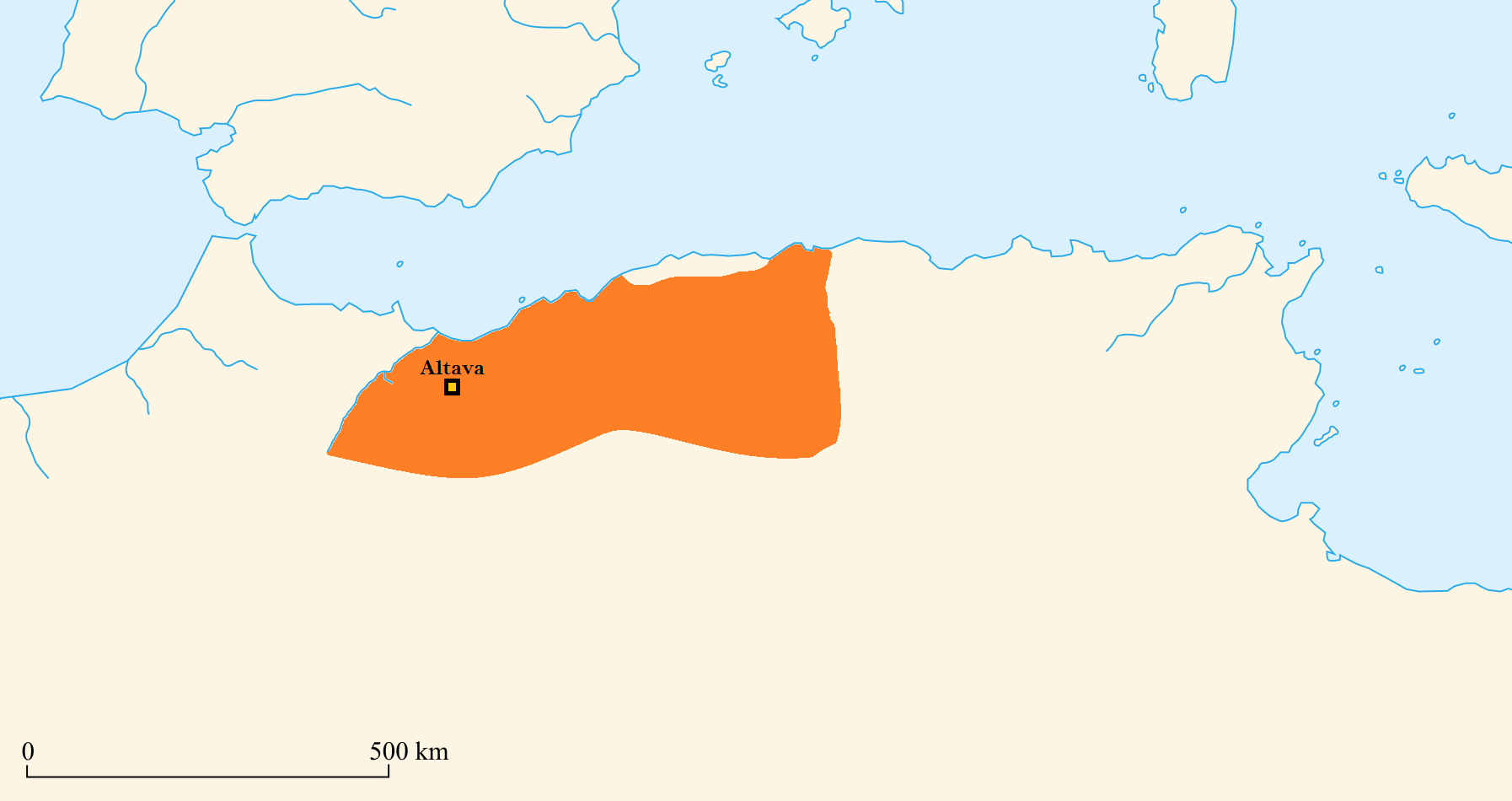
Map of the Mauro-Roman Kingdom prior to its collapse in the sixth century.

The Mauro-Roman Kingdom was established in the early fifth century after following partial Berber conquests of Roman Mauretania. Direct Roman rule had already become confined to a few coastal cities (such as Septem in Mauretania Tingitana and Caesarea in Mauretania Caesariensis) by the late 3rd century. Historical sources about inland areas are sparse, but these were apparently controlled by local Berber rulers who, however, maintained a degree of Roman culture, including the local cities, and usually nominally acknowledged the suzerainty of the Roman Emperors.

After the Vandal conquest of Northern Africa and the establishment of the Vandal Kingdom, these cities became completely isolated and eventually fell into the control of the romanized berber people of the region. The berbers would form an independent barbarian kingdom, dubbed the Regnum Maurorum et Romanorum, the "Kingdom of the Moors and Romans". This kingdom would be a local power, often finding itself at war with the neighboring Vandal Kingdom. When the Eastern Roman Empire invaded the Vandals in their successful attempt at reconquering Northern Africa, the Mauro-Roman Kingdom under Masuna allied with them against the Vandals. However, subsequent rulers would come into conflict with the Empire. After a failed military campaign under King Garmul against the Eastern Roman Empire, the Empire reincorporated some coastal territories and the Kingdom collapsed.

=== Altavan rump-state ===
Though the domain of the Mauro-Roman Kingdom had collapsed, a romanized Berber kingdom continued to be ruled from the city of Altava, though it was significantly smaller in size than the Kingdom ruled by Garmul had been. During this period, Christianity became the predominant religion in the Altava kingdom, with syncretic influences from the traditional Berber religion. A new church was built in the capital Altava in this period.

The last recorded ruler of the Kingdom of Altava was Caecilius, called Koceila or Kusaila ("leopard" in Tamazight). He died in the year 690 AD fighting against the Muslim conquest of the Maghreb. He was also leader of the Awraba tribe of the Imazighen and possibly Christian head of the Sanhadja confederation. He is known for having led an effective Berber martial resistance against the Umayyad Caliphate's conquest of the Maghreb in the 680s.

Indeed, in 683 AD Uqba ibn Nafi was ambushed and killed in the Battle of Vescera near Biskra by Kusaila, who forced all Arabs to evacuate their just founded Kairouan and withdraw to Cyrenaica. But in 688 AD Arab reinforcements from Abd al-Malik ibn Marwan arrived under Zuhair ibn Kays. Caecilius met them in 690 AD -with the support of Byzantine troops- at the Battle of Mamma. Vastly outnumbered, the Awraba and Byzantines were defeated and Caecilius was killed.

With the death of Caecilius, the torch of resistance passed to a tribe known as the Jerawa tribe, who had their home in the Aurès Mountains: his Christian Berber troops after his death fought later under Kahina, the last Queen of the romanized Berbers.

== List of Kings of Altava ==
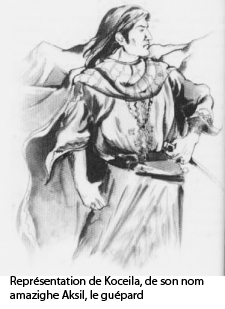
King Caecilius of Altava.

Monarch	Reign	Notes
Unknown ruler(s)		No recorded rulers between 578 and the 670s.
Sekerdid "the Roman"	670s?	Apparently of Eastern Roman descent, seemingly abdicated and later assisted Caecilius in battle.
Caecilius	680-690	Last King of Altava, led an effective Berber military resistance against the Muslim invasion of the Maghreb in the 680s. Also known as Aksil in Berber and Kusaila in Arabic.

== See also ==
- Mauro-Roman Kingdom
- Exarchate of Africa

== Bibliography ==
- Barnes, Timothy . The New Empire of Diocletian and Constantine. Cambridge, MA: Harvard University Press, 1982. ISBN 0-7837-2221-4
- Camps, G. Rex gentium Maurorum et Romanorum. Recherches sur les royaumes de Maurétanie des VIe et VIIe siècles
- Hrbek, I., ed. General History of Africa III: Africa From the Seventh to the Eleventh Century.
- Diehl, Charles (1896). L'Afrique Byzantine. Histoire de la Domination Byzantine en Afrique (533–709) (in French). Paris, France: Ernest Leroux.
- Modéran, Y. Kusayla, l'Afrique et les Arabes. In "Identités et Cultures dans l'Algérie Antique", University of Rouen, 2005 (ISBN 2-87775-391-3).
- Conant, Jonathan (2012). Staying Roman : conquest and identity in Africa and the Mediterranean, 439-700. Cambridge New York: Cambridge University Press. pp. 280–281. ISBN 978-0521196970.
