= Awraba =

North African Berber tribe

The Awraba were a Berber tribe in North Africa which formed part of the Baranis confederation. They were known for playing a primary role in the resistance to the Muslim conquest of the Maghreb during the 7th century, particularly during the rebellion led by their king Kusaila. After this event, having mostly converted to Islam, they were known for welcoming Idris I, an 'Alid refugee fleeing the 'Abbasids to the east, and helping him establish the Idrisid dynasty.

== Origins ==
The Awraba are from western Algeria and probably originate from the Constantine region. In antiquity, Cherchell and Algiers were the western and eastern limits of the territory of the Awraba. They are described as authentic descendants of the ancient Numidians. At the time of the arrival of the Arabs, the Awraba were situated in the regions of the Zab and the western Aures. Furthermore, the name "WRB" found in several necropolises in northeastern Algeria would also indicate that the Awerba were in Numidia during antiquity. After the death of Kusaila, the Awraba were driven out of the central Maghreb and migrated to Volubilis, these Awraba called themselves descendants of the Awraba of the Aures. The Awraba were also later found to occupy the region of Tobna and the Zab during the 9th century.
