= Encyclopédie berbère =

French-language encyclopaedia for studies on the Berbers

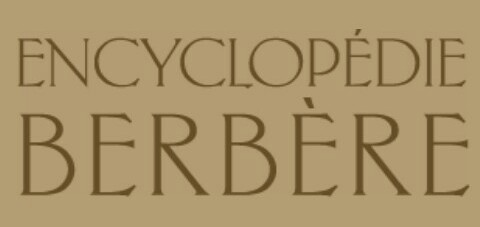
- Official logo for the encyclopedia
- Author: 14 editors; 17 godfathers
- Language: French
- Genre: Encyclopedia
- Publisher: Édisud (1984–2010); Peeters (2010–)
- Publication date: 1984–present
- Publication place: France
- Media type: print copies and online edition
- Pages: 100 p. (on average); 124 cm
- Website: Encyclopédie berbère at OpenEdition Journals

Encyclopédie berbère (English: Berber Encyclopaedia) is a French-language encyclopaedia dealing with subjects related to the Berber peoples (Imazighen in Berber language), published both in print editions and in a partial online version.

It was launched in 1984 under the aegis of UNESCO and was originally published by Editions Edisud. Its first editor-in-chief was Gabriel Camps. After his death in 2002, he was succeeded by Salem Chaker, Professor of Berber languages at the Aix-Marseille University.

Up to 2013, volumes 1 to 36 (Oryx - Ozoutae) have been published online through OpenEdition.org. The online site allows part of the encyclopedia to be viewed in full text and in PDF and offers a search function to key words and authors. However, the latest five volumes are excluded from the online edition, in agreement with Éditions Peeters, which sells the printed copies and has already been publishing other Berber studies. Up to 2019, Fasc. XLIII (volume 43) for the entries (Siga - Syphax) has been published.
