= Garmul =

Berber king

- King of Altava
- Entrance to Jedar F, theorized to be Garmul's burial place. The entrance is decorated with a Chi-Rho (left) and an Hexafoil (right)

King of the Mauro-Roman Kingdom
- Reign: c. 570–578
- Predecessor: Last recorded previous ruler John
- Successor: Unnamed ruler(s) (possibly); Sekerdid (indirectly)
- Born: Middle of the c. 6th century Possibly Medroussa
- Died: c. 578; Between Mauretania Caesariensis and Mauretania Tingitana
- Burial: Possibly Jedar F (Note: "Thirty years later, the king of the Moors (and of the Romans of Mauretania) was a certain Garmul, whom Jean de Biclar describes as a very powerful ruler who successively defeated the Prefect of Africa, Theodore (569), the magister militum Thevestinos, and in 571, another magister militum, Amalis. Garmul was defeated and killed in 579. It is to him, or to one of his successors, that we can attribute Djedar F, which appears to be the oldest structure in the Djebel Araoui, suggesting that the dynasty survived until the 7th century and had to endure the shock of the Arab conquest." Gabriel Camps, "Djedar" (french))
- Religion: Christianity

Garmul or Gasmul (Latin: Gasmulem), was a Berber king of the Mauro-Roman Kingdom. He is known for his various military campaigns, and raids against the Byzantine rulers of North Africa.

== Biography ==
Garmul is known for his various military campaigns, and raids against the Byzantine rulers of North Africa. in one of his raids, He destroyed a Byzantine army in 571, launched raids into Byzantine territory, and three successive generals (the praetorian prefect Theodore and the magister militum Theoctistus in 570, and Theoctistus' successor Amabilis in 571) are recorded by John of Biclaro to have been killed in a battle by Garmul's forces. His activities, especially when regarded together with the simultaneous Visigoth attacks in Spania, presented a clear threat to the province's authorities. Thus the new emperor, Tiberius II Constantine, re-appointed Thomas as praetorian prefect, and the able general Gennadius was posted as magister militum with the clear aim of ending Garmul's campaigns. Preparations were lengthy and careful, but the campaign itself, launched in 577–78, was brief and effective, with Gennadius utilizing terror tactics against Garmul's subjects. Garmul was defeated and killed by 579, and the coastal corridor between Tingitana and Caesariensis secured. After the death of the old warrior, the Berbers were discouraged and ended up submitting under the domination of the Byzantine Empire.

It is to him, or to one of his successors, that the Jedar F which appears to be the oldest funerary monument of this type in the Djebel Araoui can be attributed.

== Notes ==
Regnal titles
Preceded by Unknown last previous king known John	King of the Moors and Romans c. 570–578	Succeeded by Collapse of the Mauro-Roman Kingdom
