= Cabaon =

6th-century Berber chief of Tripolitania

Cabaon was a Berber chief of Tripolitania in the beginning of the sixth century, known essentially by a rather long passage in the Vandal War of Procopius, for his tactics during the Tripolitania expedition in 523.

During the reign of Thrasamund, for unspecified reasons, the Vandals launched an expedition against Cabaon. Although not himself a Christian, the Moorish leader then decided, according to Procopius, to send spies on the backs of the Vandals to repair the damage that the Arian fanatics would cause to the buildings of the worship. The ensuing battle in an unknown place was a disaster for Thrasamund's troops, baffled by Berber tactics. In a pattern that would be repeated later, they took shelter behind a rampart of camels and fought on foot, essentially making use of ranged weapons that decimated the Vandals squadrons. The battle seemed to be a resounding success for the Berbers, but the immediate consequences were unknown because Procopius never mentioned Cabaon again, and no link was established between that battle and the long Moorish Wars later. The episode, however, had a rather rich historiographic posterity. The Byzantine compilers were fascinated by the paradoxical respect shown by Cabaon towards Catholic worship; the latter of which interested Evagrius, and led him to copy the passage from Procopius in his Ecclesiastical History.
