= Battle of Mamma =

680s battle

- Part of the Muslim conquest of the Maghreb
Date	686–690
Location	Valley of Mamma, east of Timgad in the Aurès Mountains, Algeria 35°29′3″N 6°28′7″E
Result	Umayyad victory

Belligerents
Umayyad Caliphate	Kingdom of Altava; Byzantine Empire

Commanders and leaders
Zuhayr ibn Qays	Caecilius †
- Location within Algeria

The Battle of Mamma or the Battle of Mammes (Arabic: معركة ممس) took place at some point between the years 686 and 690 or otherwise before 688. The belligerents were the Arab Muslim forces of the Umayyad Caliphate against the Berbers led by Caecilius of the Kingdom of Altava.

== Background ==
The Arab general Uqba ibn Nafi had led his men in an expedition across North Africa, eventually reaching the Atlantic Ocean and marching as far south as the Draa and Sous rivers. On his return to the east, he was ambushed by the Berber-Byzantine coalition led by Caecilius at the Battle of Vescera in which he was defeated and killed in 682. Caecilius at that time held undisputed mastery over North Africa and marched to Kairouan in triumph.

When Abd al-Malik ibn Marwan became the caliph, he was effective in increasing the size of his empire. Therefore, he ordered Zuhayr ibn Qays who was stationed in Barqa to lead an army to retake Ifriqiya and its capital Kairouan.

In order to mount a stronger resistance, Caecilius took a position in the Aurès Mountains in which he could manage to retreat in case of defeat, while the Muslim leader Zuhayr took a decision to camp outside Kairouan near the water resources.

After a heavy battle in the valley of Mamma, the Muslims eventually managed to defeat the defending troops and to kill Caecilius.

== Aftermath ==
The Arab leader Zuhayr and his troops went back to Barqa to fight against the invading Byzantines. The incoming ships of Byzantines came with large numbers of soldiers which defeated the Arabs and killed Zuhayr.
