= Gabriel Camps =

French historian and scholar (1927–2002)

- Born: 20 May 1927; Misserghin, French Algeria
- Died: 6 September 2002 (aged 75); Aix-en-Provence
- Occupation(s): archaeologist and social anthropologist

Gabriel Camps (May 20, 1927 – September 6, 2002) was a French archaeologist and social anthropologist, the founder of the Encyclopédie berbère and is considered a prestigious scholar on the history of the Berber people.

== Biography ==
Gabriel Camps was born in Misserghin, French Algeria. He attended secondary school in Oran, and studied later in Algiers. In 1961, he graduated from Algiers University with a PhD thesis about the protohistorical monuments and burial rites of Berber people, called Aux origines de la Berbérie. Monuments et rites funéraires protohistoriques, as well as with a second thesis on the Numidian king Masinissa.

In 1959, Gabriel Camps entered the French National Centre for Scientific Research (CNRS). After the independence of Algeria, he worked from 1962 to 1969 as director of the Centre de recherches anthropologiques, préhistoriques et ethnologiques (CRAPE) and of the National Ethnographic and Prehistoric Museum of Bardo at Algiers. He also directed the Institut de recherches sahariennes and the scientific journal Libyca.

In 1969, he moved to Aix-en-Provence, where he worked as professor at the University of Provence. There he founded the Laboratoire d'anthropologie et de préhistoire de la Méditerranée occidentale (LAPMO), frequented by numerous students, mostly from Maghreb countries.

Gabriel Camps undertook research and published on the prehistoric and pre-Roman epochs of North Africa, but also on the Berber kingdoms, the Libyan script and the Punic people. Most of this work focussed on Berber history, and in 1984 he was the founder and first editor-in-chief of the Encyclopédie berbère, launched under the aegis of UNESCO. The largest part of Camps's research was done on Algeria, although he worked also on Corsica.

His wife, Henriette Camps-Fabrer (1928-2015) was a French cultural anthropologist and wrote several books about the jewellery of the Berbers in Algeria and the Maghreb between the 1970s and 1990.

Camps died in 2002 in Aix-en-Provence; on his death, the Algerian Minister of Culture expressed his condolences to the University.

== Works ==
- Afrique du Nord au féminin, Perrin, 1992.
- Encyclopédie berbère, Édisud, 1985-2002 : 25 sections and more than 4,000 pages, half of them written by Camps.
- Berbères, mémoire et identité, Errance, 1987. Republished in 2007, at Éditions Actes Sud
- Préhistoire d'une île. La Corse des origines, 1988, Errance, 1991.
- Introduction à la Préhistoire, Perrin, Collection Point Histoire, 1982.
- Atlas préhistorique du Midi méditerranéen français, 1978-1981 (a joint work directed by Camps)
- Les Berbères, aux marges de l'Histoire, Hespérides, 1980.
- Épipaléolithique méditerranéen, 1975 (a joint work directed by Camps)
- L'Homme de Cro-Magnon, 1970, Faton, 1992 (a joint work directed by Camps)
