= Byzantine–Moorish wars =

Series of wars between Byzantine Empire and Berber kingdoms (533–548)

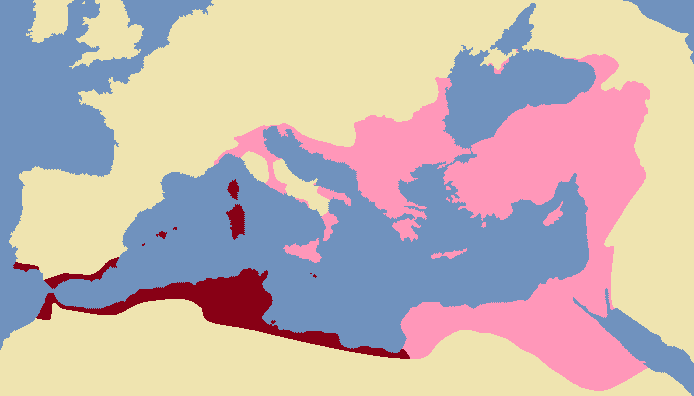
- Byzantine Africa around 600
Date	533–548
Location	Modern day Tunisia, Algeria, Libya, and Morocco
Result	Byzantine victory
Territorial changes	Status quo ante bellum: Berbers retain inland territories in North Africa

Belligerents
Byzantine Empire; Huns; Pro-Roman Berbers	Berber kingdoms and rebels: Mauro-Roman kingdom; Kingdom of the Aurès; Kingdom of the Dorsale; Kingdom of Cabaon; Mastraciani; Ifuraces; Laguatans; Tingitanian Berbers; Other tribes and confederations

Commanders and leaders
Solomon †; Aïgan †; Rufinus (executed); Areobindus (executed); Athanasius; John Troglita; Putzintulus †; Geisirith; Ifisdaïas; Masuna; Althias; Cutzinas; Ortaias; Bezina; Iabdas; John the Armenian †	Cutzinas (surrendered); Iabdas (until early 547); Mastigas; Ortaias; Stotzas †; Antalas (surrendered); Stotzas the younger (executed); Ierna (executed); Carcasan †; Bruten

Casualties and losses
Unknown	Unknown

The Byzantine–Moorish wars were a series of wars fought between the Byzantine Empire and the various Berber kingdoms that formed after the collapse of Roman North Africa. The war also featured other rebels and states such as the mutineers of Stotzas and the short lived Vandalic rump state of Guntarith. Following two insurrections and some initial Berber successes, the war eventually ended with the Berbers' defeat at the Battle of the Fields of Cato while attempting to drive out the Byzantines from North Africa.

== Sources ==
The two sources for the Byzantine wars in North Africa during the sixth century are Corippus and Procopius. Both are important primary sources. Procopius accompanied the Roman army during its campaigns and was in direct contact with Belisarius, while Corippus was a Roman poet who witnessed the wars. Both provide a relatively similar timeline of events in Africa. However, Corippus seems to have written a panegyric which praises the exploits of John Troglita, and justifies the policies of the Byzantines. As such, Corippus' account is seen as pro-Byzantine and needs to be viewed with some caution.

== Background ==
Since the middle of the fifth century, the province of North Africa was occupied by the Vandals. Nevertheless, a peace had existed between the Eastern Roman Empire and the Vandals since the Fall of the Western Roman Empire in 476. However, the Emperor Justinian had the great ambition of restoring the Roman Empire in the West. As such, following Hilderic's deposition, Justinian commenced the invasion of North Africa

General Belisarius's expedition quickly defeated the Vandals who were severely weakened by wars with the native Berber population. In 533, the capital Carthage was captured, less than a year after the expedition began. Justinian wanted to restore Roman Africa to the state it had been before the Vandal conquest. As such, the old provinces were restored, with the only difference being that those provinces were now part of the Praetorian Prefecture of Africa rather than that of Italy, as Italy was controlled by the Ostrogoths. The border was again fixed on the old limes. i.e. those before the conquest and Justinian announced that he intended to expel all the "barbarian" peoples, which refers to the various Berber kingdoms and tribes which had formed either through wars with the Vandals, or following the collapse of the Vandalic kingdom.

Mauri or Moor was the name given to the Berbers who inhabit North Africa from the Atlantic to the Syrtic range in Tripolitania and who lived in tribal structures. From the death of King Genseric in 477, the Moorish tribes had been a source of constant revolt against the Vandals. What had been "modest" Moorish communities had grown into much larger and organized peoples. Several hypotheses have been discussed to explain it today. This could have been due to an exodus of imperfectly Romanized peasants fleeing Vandal power, or nomadic groups from the Sahara. In 530, the chieftain Guenfan and his son Antalas inflicted defeat upon the army of the Vandal king Hilderic in Byzacena, in the Battle of Great Dorsale. The tribes were thus able to directly threaten the interior of the territory.

Each freshly established Byzantine province in Africa were threatened by various Berber peoples, but the main kingdoms and political entities included:

- The Kingdom of the Aurès led by king Iabdas (also known as Iaudas), whom became independent in 484 after defeating the Vandals
- The Kingdom of Altava led by king Masuna also known as the Mauro-Roman kingdom a Romanized Berber kingdom whom became independent in the 470s after Gaiseric's death and then rapidly expanded across western Algeria taking nearly all of the province of Mauretania Caesariensis except for the city of Ceaserea by 533
- The Kingdom of Hodna led by king Ortaias, situated in and outside the Hodna Mountains and ruling important cities such as Sitifis
- The Kingdom of the Dorsale was a kingdom established by the Frexenses tribe
- The Laguatan kingdom established by king Cabaon, threatening the Romans of Tripolitania.

During the Vandalic War, the Moors remained neutral and submitted by declaring themselves "servants of the emperor" before Belisarius. This ritual practiced in the Vandal era seems to date back perhaps even to the High Empire. It is similar to Fœdus i.e. an alliance between Rome and a barbarian people defined by treaty. In exchange, the Moors received gifts and insignia of power from the Byzantines. However, according to Christian Courtois, during this ceremony, the two parties were committed, and that the neutrality of the Moors who "wait, without taking sides for one or the other, the outcome of the fighting", places them far from the status of "slaves of the Emperor".

== Pacification of Africa under Solomon and the First Moorish insurrection (534-543) ==
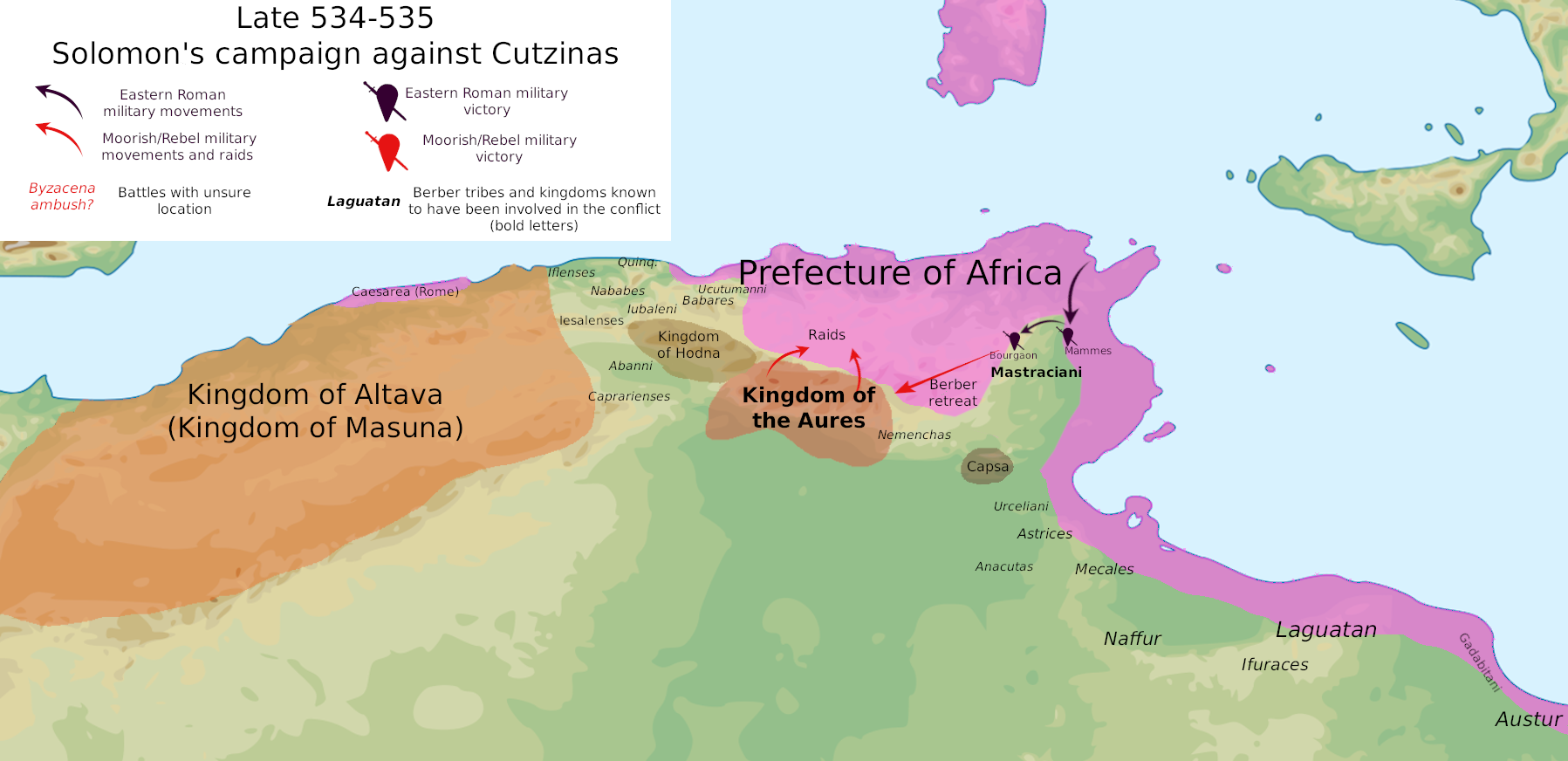
The campaigns of Solomon against the Mastraciani and their allies

General Solomon, the former lieutenant of Belisarius who was an energetic, competent and courageous general, became the new governor. He faced a Moorish (Berber) insurrection and a mutiny in an army led by Stotzas. The situation in Africa was so precarious that Justinian bestowed on him the civil and military powers that were traditionally divided under the Roman administrative system since Diocletian. He thus became both the magister militum and praetorian prefect.

Solomon was unable to enforce the Emperor's expulsion decrees. Shortly after his appointment, certain Berber kingdoms and tribes, including the Kingdom of the Aurès led by Yabdas and the Mastraciani tribe of Cusina, revolted and began to ravage the territory, no doubt inspired by the fact of Belisarius's departure.The Berbers became bellicose primarily in response to Byzantine pressure and shifting power dynamics. Initially, their actions were defensive, aimed at preserving territorial gains made during the Vandal period and securing recognition from the new Byzantine authorities. After 544, military successes and the arrival of powerful allies such as the Laguatan emboldened them to pursue more ambitious political goals. Leaders like Antalas oscillated between seeking renewed accommodation with Byzantium and attempting to establish autonomous rule.

In 536, the general's campaigns partially subdued the Moors. Pensions were paid to Moorish chiefs that resulted in them and their peoples not being expelled from their territories. Following decisive victories in the Battle of Mammes and the Battle of Bourgaon in 535, the emperor regarded peace as established.

It can be noted that Roman infantry and heavy cavalry were not suited to a war waged against a semi-nomadic tribe equipped with very lightly armed troops. Moorish troops were able to wage guerrilla warfare and retreat from large armed engagements without suffering too great a loss,essentially fighting a war of ambush. Additionally, the Moors were highly mobile and could hide and retreat to their home in the mountains and the desert.

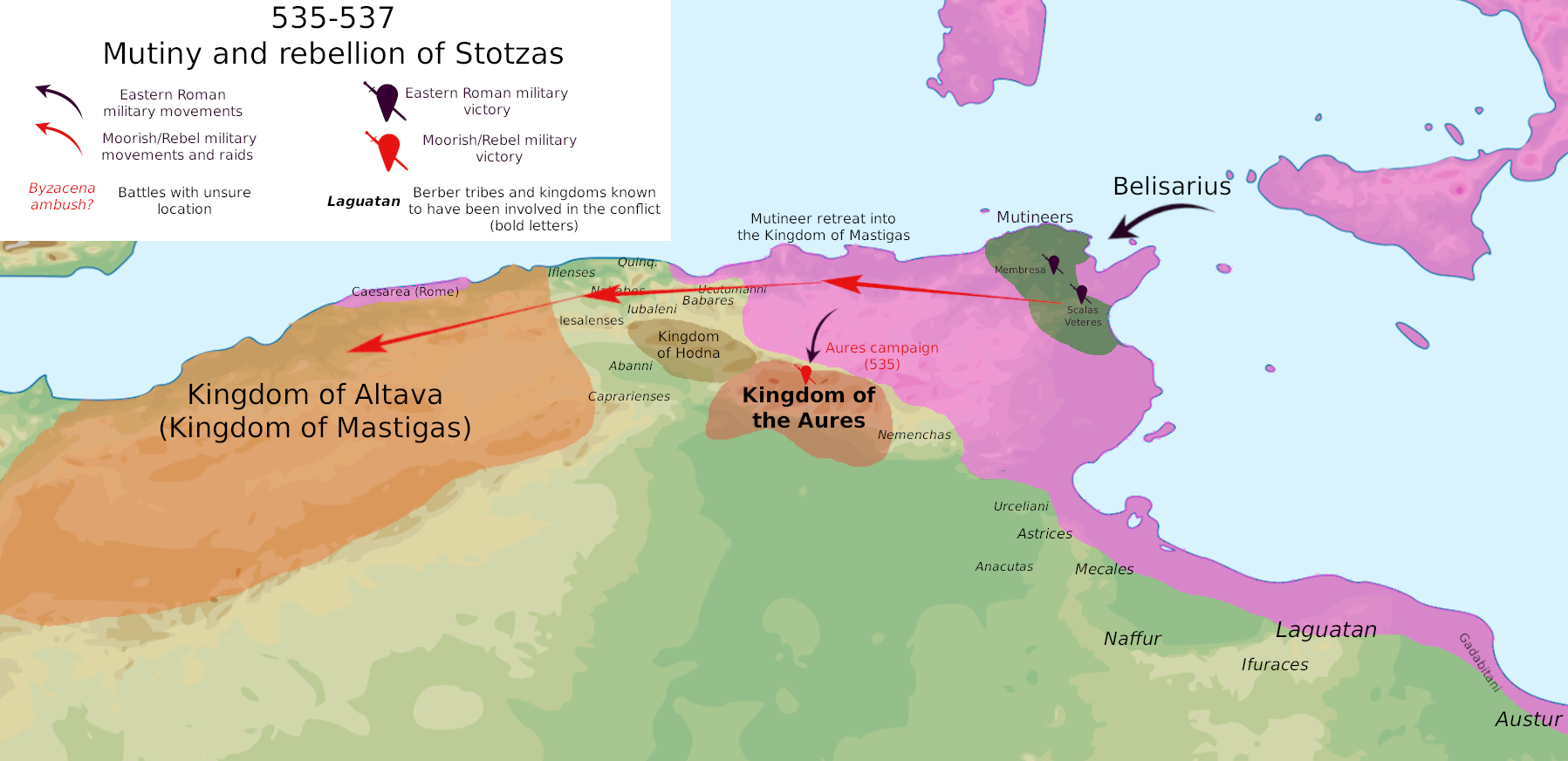
Mutiny against Solomon and the restoration of order.

Additionally, Byzantine Africa's well-equipped and trained Byzantine army was undisciplined and lacked loyalty. As such, its troops were eager to loot and civilians complained of abuses by the soldiers. General Solomon was also unpopular as he was considered too strict and therefore did not command the same respect as Belisarius in Africa. In 536, a plot to assassinate him in Carthage failed. The army mutinied soon after and Solomon was forced to flee to Sicily. An army general, Germanus, a cousin of Justinian, was sent to restore order. Solomon did not resume his duties until 539.

In 540 Solomon successfully conquered the Kingdom of the Aurès after an intense campaign that lasted months. The Berber kingdom served as a base of operation for guerillas and raids, and there had already been a failed attempt to conquer it in 535. It's king, Yabdas, fled the Aurès Mountains into the western kingdom of Altava led by Mastigas.

Medieval Arabic sources mention an inscription found during the era of the Fatimid Caliphate in Tiaret that commemorated the defeat of local Berbers by Solomon, possibly referring to a later campaign against the Altavan king Mastigas. However, it is known that the kingdom could have only been partially conquered, and that the region of Tiaret was not held by the Romans for long as it soon came under Altavan control again and later became the capital of the Kingdom of Ouarsenis. As such, the region was likely lost to the Berbers during the Second insurrection.

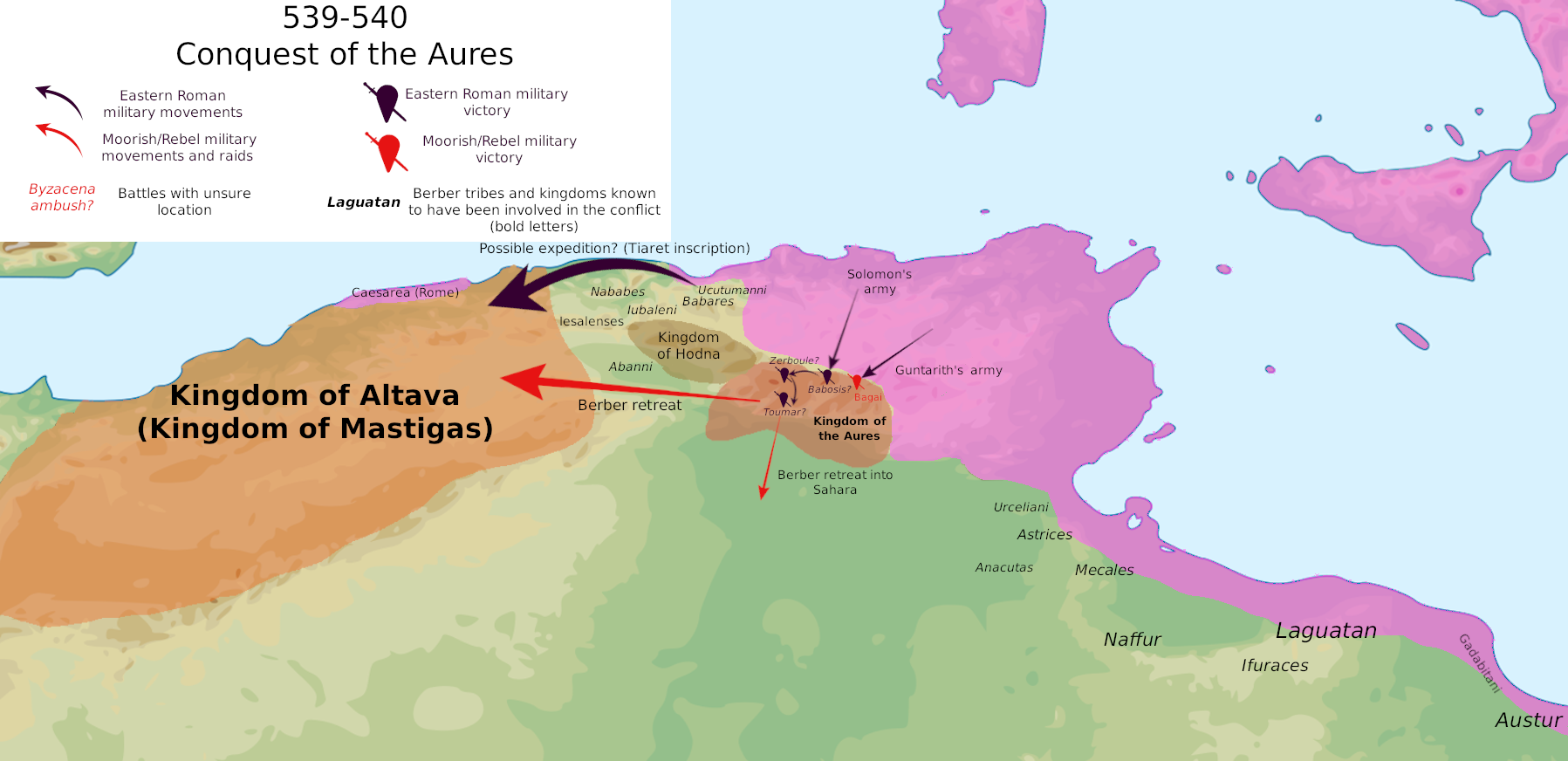
Solomon successfully conquered and pacified most of the North African tribes and kingdoms by 540, nearly restoring Byzantine control across the entirety of what was once Roman Africa.

== The outbreak of the Second Moorish insurrection ==
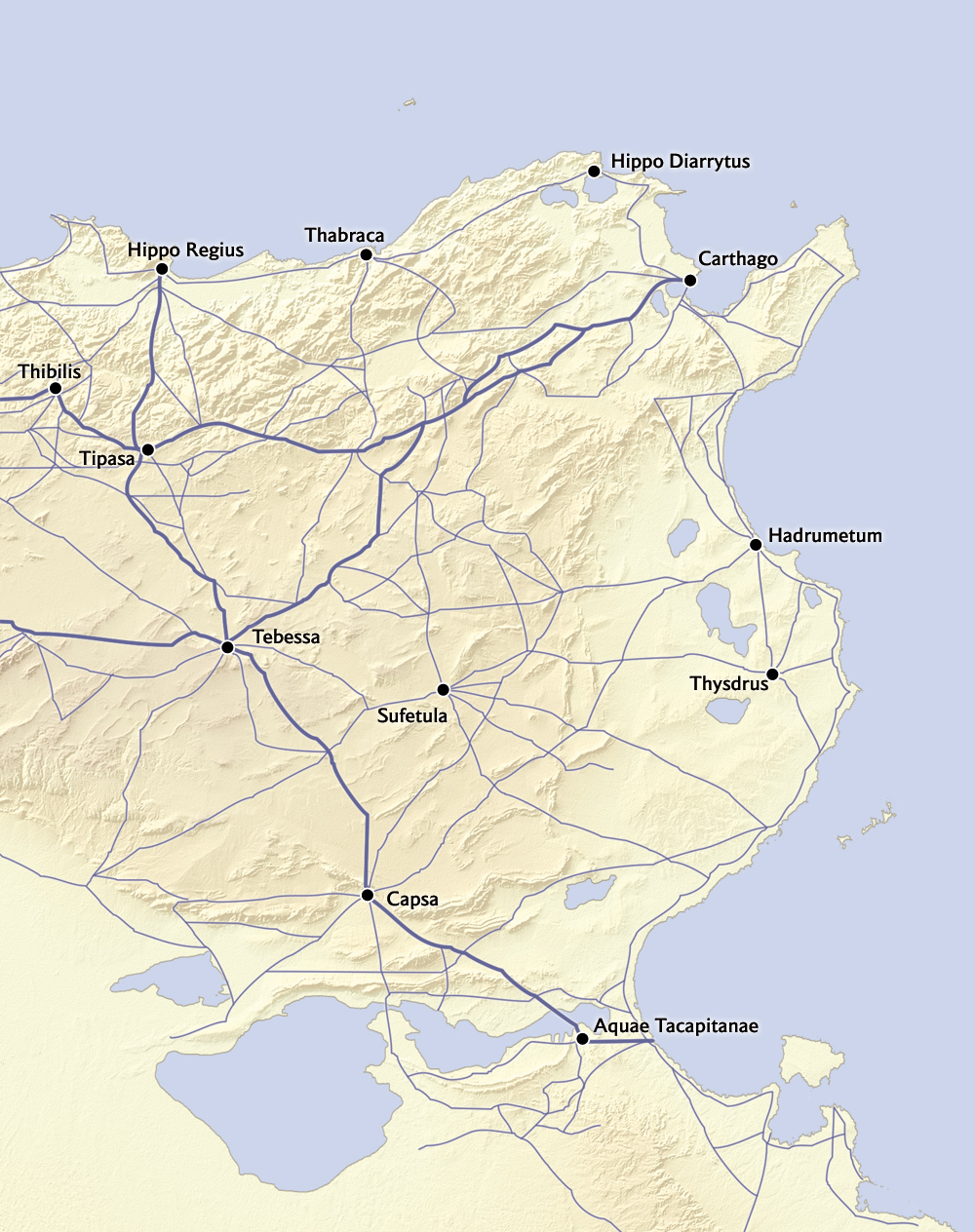
We see here the road Théveste (current Tébessa, in Algeria)-Carthage. Sufetula (current Sbeïtla, in Tunisia) is located in the southeast, in the Tunisian ridge. The capital of Proconsular Africa (and the praetorian prefecture of Africa), Carthage, and Byzacena, Hadrumetum are visible on this map.

Between 539 and 541, the governor Solomon built fortifications around the regions held by the Berbers. The country seemed to have experienced real peace and prosperity according to the Roman poet Corippus. However, a diplomatic affront to several Berber leaders triggered a second Moorish insurrection. Sergius, the nephew of Solomon and governor of Tripolitania, received a considerable delegation of Moorish leaders in Leptis Magna who called up many charges against the Romans. However, following a confusion, the Moorish leaders were all murdered, resulting in the Laguatans rising up and invading the region. The incident may not have just been due to the governor's incompetence and arrogance, but also of the pressure exerted on the governor by local Roman elites, who had wanted to keep the Moors away from their lands and homes. However, around the same time in 543, Solomon offended the chief Antalas. He saw his pension cut off and learned that his brother had been killed by Solomon, for causing trouble. Rather than going directly up the road near the coast that goes up towards Byzacena and Carthage, the Laguatan joined Antalas in the mountains of Byzacena near the Theveste-Carthage road. It was considered a strategic road, because it enabled communication between the Roman fortifications in the dorsals which protected the Roman cities in the plains near the coasts.

== The Battle of Cillium and the death of Solomon ==
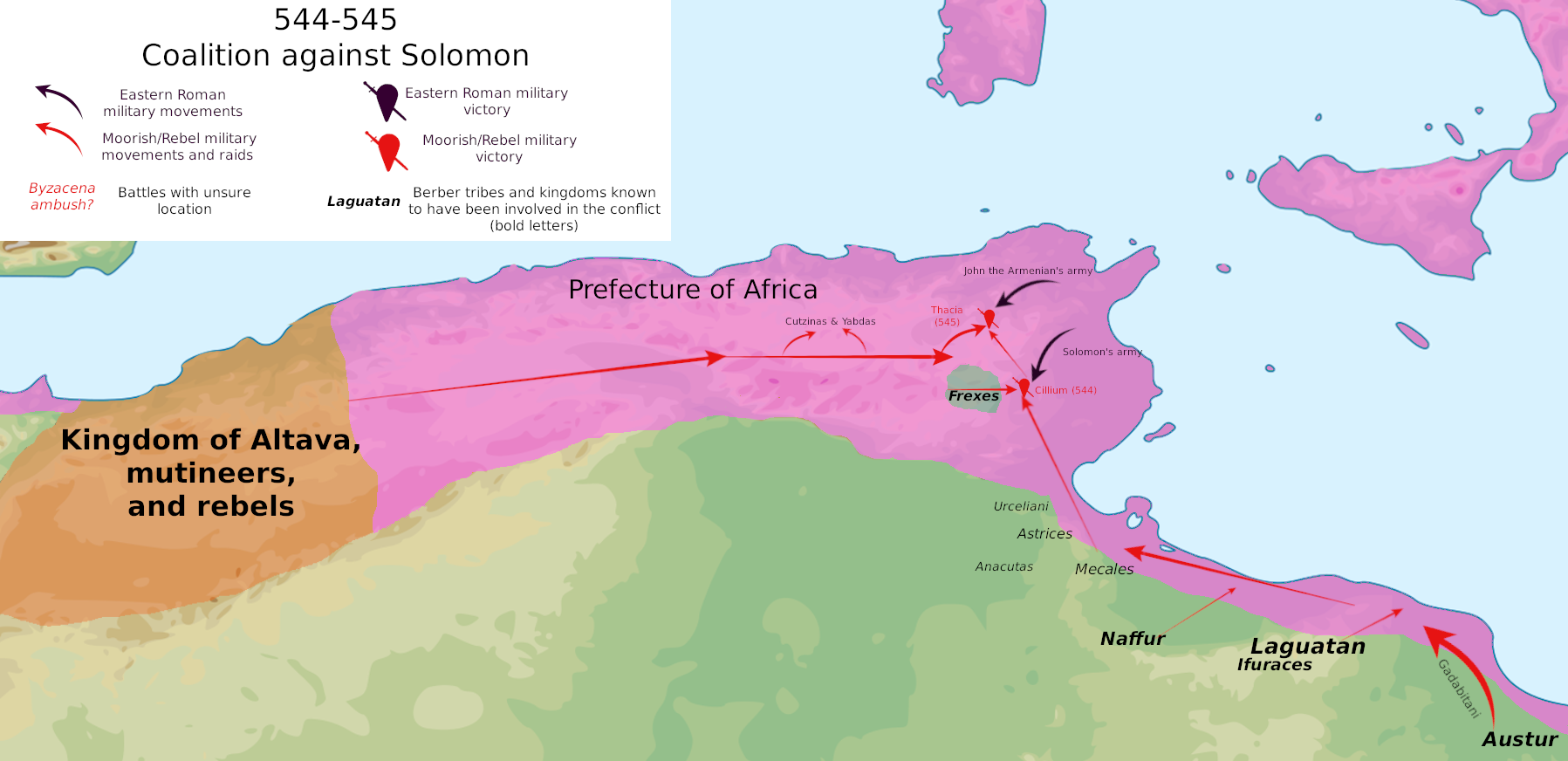
The start of the Second insurrection

Solomon hurriedly set off to meet the revolting Moors from Theveste, on the Theveste-Carthage road. Taking his army through the forests, he found himself in Cillium facing the enemy. The general may have intended to join either his ally Cutzinas who lived in this territory or other Moorish allies. According to Corippus, he was accompanied by native contingents, though it is not known if Cutzinas, who had promised his help, had come to join him. According to Procopius, Solomon had the help of Sergius and other important Byzantine military contingents from Africa, but no native contingent was mentioned.

During the battle between the Romans and the Moors, the Byzantine troops were lacking unity, with many fighting reluctantly and some even refusing to fight. Solomon, surrounded by a small number of his guards, was able to hold off the attacks of the Berbers for some time. Finally, due to his inability to resist any longer, he fled with his guards to the edge of a torrent which flowed near the battlefield. There, his horse falls into a ravine and the general was wounded. Surrounded and overwhelmed, Solomon was captured and killed by the Berbers with part of his bodyguards.

The Roman troops were thus defeated, partly because some soldiers had fled, which could be due to betrayal. Corippus attributes the defeat to both the soldiers' displeasure at not taking part in the looting of the previous battle, and the betrayal of the future rebel leader of Germanic origin, Guntharic, who was then dux of Numidia.

== Temporary end of Byzantine control and anarchy ==
The defeat at Cillium plunged Africa into military anarchy until the arrival of John Troglita in 546. Meanwhile, a great Moorish coalition was formed. However, despite its potential to expel the Byzantines from Africa entirely, it did not succeed due to the lack of unity and common strategy among the Moors. Among the Romans, the death of Solomon left a military and political void that only the arrival of John Troglita would fill. In the short term however, the tribes were content on plundering as much as possible, up to the walls of Carthage.

=== A Moorish grand coalition close to expelling the Byzantines from Africa ===
The death of Solomon and his defeat had an impact as far as Spain, where the Visigoths took advantage of it to besiege Septimius beyond the Strait of Gibraltar. The tribes who had declared themselves faithful in Africa to Solomon considered themselves released from their commitments and joined the rebels, with one example being Cutzinas.

The Moors went up the Theveste-Carthage road and briefly succeeded in taking the capital of Byzacena (Hadrumetum), by trickery before it fell, by the same process, into Roman hands.

The Laguatan were unwilling to engage in prolonged sieges, which led to their withdrawal to their homelands in the autumn of 544 and 545. This seasonal movement was dictated by the necessity of grazing their herds during the rainy season in their own territory, which extended from November to early summer. This scenario will repeat itself the following year. The goal of these chiefs was not to establish themselves in the region, but simply to profit from the looting of the territory. Nevertheless, without their help, in the first year, Antalas sent a first offer of submission to Rome, which was unanswered.

By contrast, the interior Moors sought above all to consolidate their position of strength against the empire in the territories under their control. Antalas did not seek the destruction of Roman authority or Roman urban centers, as evidenced by his attitude toward Roman civilization. This is illustrated by his decision to spare Hadrumetum and its inhabitants after capturing the city. Like other interior Moorish leaders, Antalas had long been in close contact with Roman culture. Beyond defending the territorial integrity of their lands within Africa, these groups sought the restoration of the traditional investiture ceremonies granted by Rome to barbarian peoples who accepted Roman overlordship and alliance—agreements previously concluded under Belisarius. However, when the balance of power shifted in his favor, Antalas pursued more ambitious aims, ultimately seeking to establish a Romano-Berber state akin to that of his neighbor by demanding recognition from the governor as king of Byzacena.

Beyond the divergence of strategic visions among the coalition’s allies, there was also a marked lack of unity between leaders and their respective peoples. Earlier historians have interpreted this fragmentation as evidence of an absence of a “Moorish national spirit.” Rivalries also divided the Moorish chieftains within their own homelands. Antalas and Cutzinas, both originating from Byzacena, for example, were in conflict with one another. This would push Cutzinas to join Troglita later, among others.

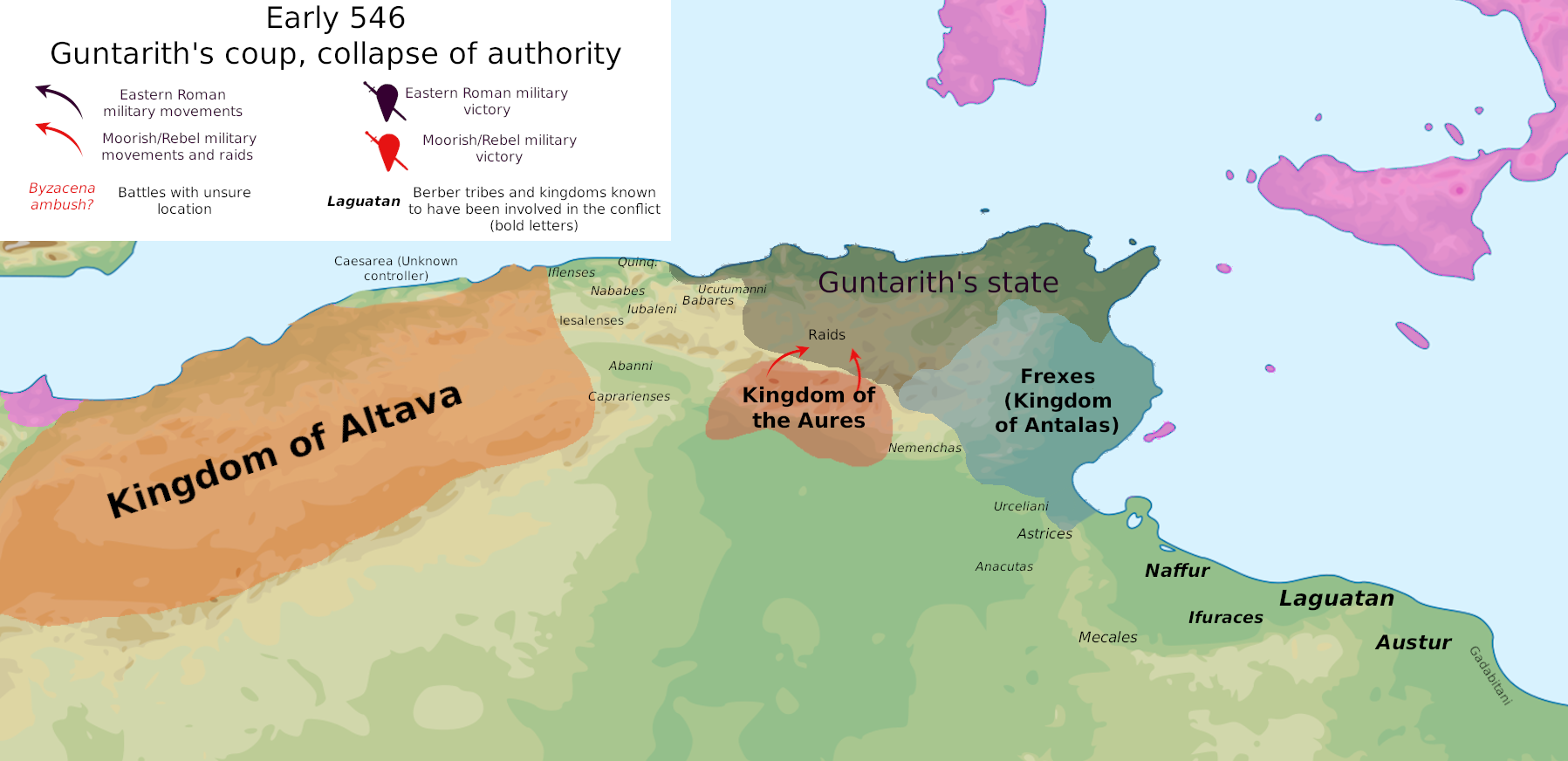
State of North Africa in early 546. Eastern Roman control had effectively ended, and only Berber kingdoms and tribes, alongside an independent statelet led by Dux Guntarith remained.

=== The political and military void left by Solomon's death ===
Solomon's death at Cillium caused Justinian to appoint Sergius, who was at the time civil and military governor of all of North Africa. The measure was to honor Solomon, although Sergius was hated by the Berbers due to the Leptis Magna massacre. Additionally, his troops and the populace see him only as an arrogant incompetent. Furthermore, John, the best officer in the army, did not cooperate with Sergius and the army remained passive. A counterattack was soon planned by John, and the Duke of Byzacena was ordered to join him. However, his army was completely destroyed when John's messengers failed to reach him to inform him that the rallying point was already occupied by the enemy. A betrayal by Roman officers soon delivered the capital of Byzacena (Hadrumetum), to the Moors. Although it was retaken by the Romans thanks to a ruse by the local inhabitants, the Moorish leaders were under the walls of Carthage and could plunder Africa as they pleased.

To remedy the situation, Areobindus was sent to share powers with Sergius, but the two men did not cooperate. At Thacia, Sergius left the army of Aerobindus to confront the Moors alone. This defeat convinced Justinian to recall the governor. Meanwhile, a mutiny by Guntharic overthrew Areobindus in Carthage. The new governor offered to share Africa with the Moors by giving Byzacena to Antalas. Guntharic was in turn overthrown by Artabanes, an Armenian officer, but he preferred to return to Constantinople rather than assume the title of magister militum of Africa that Justinian had granted him.

A political and military vacuum was therefore left by Solomon, which Sergius was unable to fill due to his incompetence. The Roman army remained demoralized, relatively impassive and suffered from the betrayal of its leaders. Corippus lamented the devastation inflicted upon Africa during this period and looked back nostalgically to the time of Solomon. Only the arrival of Troglita would remedy the situation.

== Restoration of Byzantine rule in Africa ==
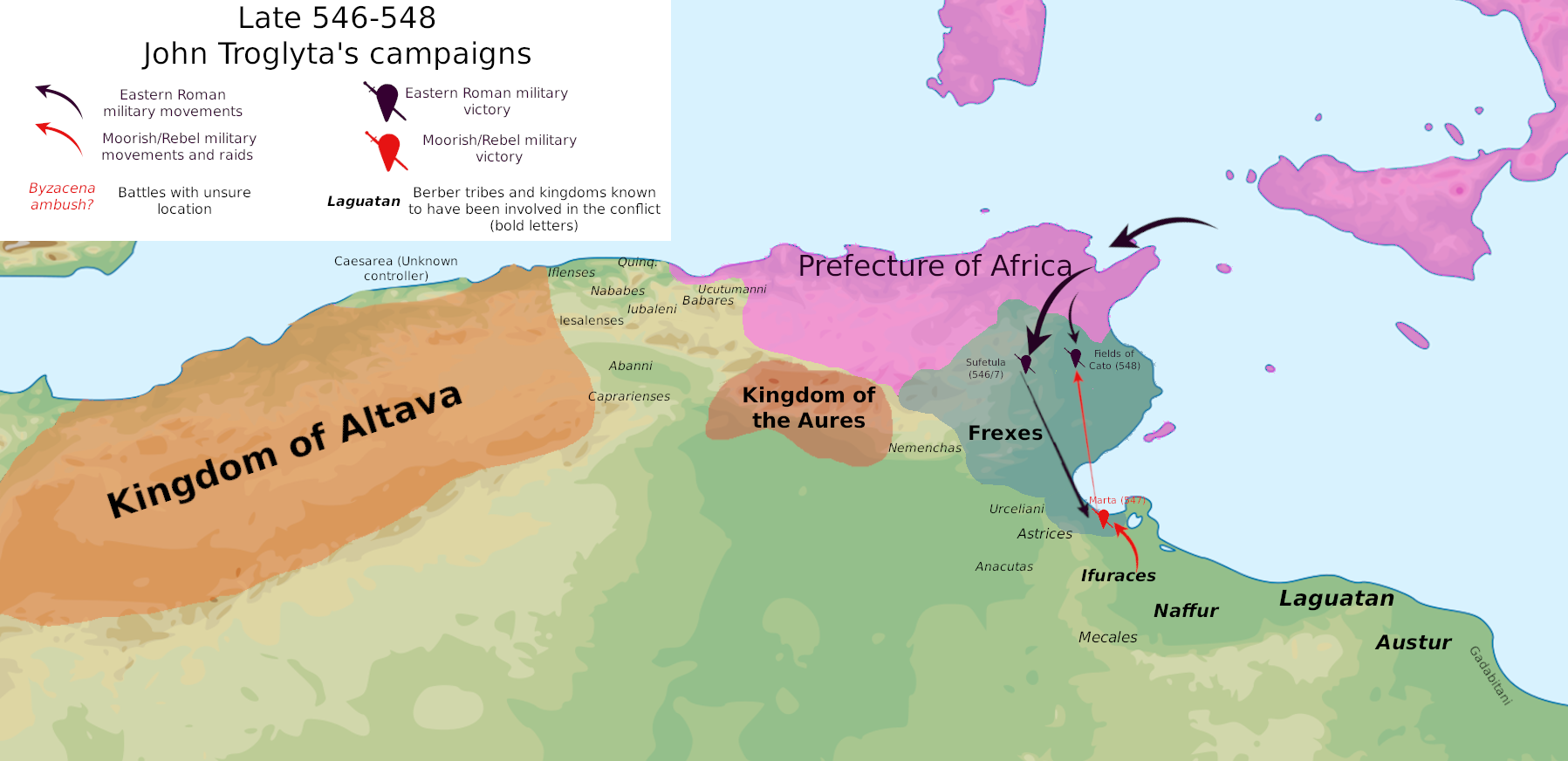
The campaigns of John Troglita

=== Campaigns of John Troglita and the end of the Second Moorish insurrection (546–548) ===
The second Moor insurrection and military anarchy would finally end after the appointment of John Troglita, a capable and experienced general, to the post of magister militum of Africa. Upon his arrival in late 546, he launched a campaign to dislodge the looters of Byzacena. At the start of 547, he inflicted a great defeat in the Battle of Sufetula (546 or 547), in the plains bordering the hills southeast of Hadrumetum. The defeat of Cillium was thus avenged. The Moors retreated to the mountains in the interior and the captured regalia of Solomon was recovered. After this defeat, Antalas became only a minor member of the coalition and was replaced by Carcasan as leader of the coalition. Carcasan was the leader of the nomadic migratory Ifuraces tribal confederation from Tripolitania.

John Troglita already had experience as the governor of an eastern province and thus he was well acquainted with negotiating with natives. He renewed the old foedus practiced under Belisarius, with only a few Moorish tribes in the interior being expelled. He reintegrated into the coalition many Moorish leaders, including Cusina. The remainder of the war was fought with the help of many Berber chieftains. Their numbers were considerable, with the contemporary Corippus mentioning 100,000, although this was likely an exaggeration.

He pursued the Berbers who had by now regrouped around the border of modern-day Libya and Tunisia, and attempted to inflict a final defeat on their forces near Marta. However, the Battle of Marta resulted in a crushing Berber victory.

Following the defeat, Troglita retreated and reorganized his troops, allowing the Berbers to advance along the Tunisian coastline. Attacking them at the Battle of the Fields of Cato, he finally defeated them and ended the war.

At the conclusion of the campaign, Carcasan was killed by Troglita himself. Antalas, by contrast, submitted to John and is thereafter no longer mentioned as a source of unrest.

=== Africa after Troglita ===
Africa was now pacified and the danger from the Laguatan was averted, with the Moorish tribes subdued. Nevertheless, the army of Byzantine Africa had the same problems with discipline and insufficient numbers as before. In addition, the army confined itself to a strict defensive function and did not reproduce campaigns like that of Troglita. Additionally, Byzantine Africa suffered from a diplomatic policy that was not always coherent, as well as not having enough competent generals and governors. Following many years of peace, the new governor after John Troglita assassinated Cutzinas in 563 and claimed his pension, causing an unrest that was only resolved by an expeditionary army. The Byzantine province of North Africa remained in the hands of the Byzantines, along with independent Berber kingdoms in the south and west, until the Arab conquests in the seventh century.

The Byzantine occupation did not fundamentally change the existing political hierarchies in Moorish Africa. An individual who previously held a title that no longer existed would merely have adopted a different symbolic language and maintained their status. However, hierarchies in this period were profoundly shaped by outside imperial authorities, both in modes of status display and in the language of authority..

== List of Battles ==
- Battle of Mammes
- Battle of Bourgaon
- Battle of Cilium
- Battle of Thacia
- Battle of Sufetula
- Battle of Marta
- Battle of the Fields of Cato

== See also ==
- Family tree of Byzantine emperors
- History of the Byzantine Empire

== Literature ==
- Corippe, J Alix (1998). La Johannide (in French). Tunis: Committee of the Institute of Carthage. OCLC 494554524.
- Corippus, Flavius Cresconius (1998). The Iohannis, or, De bellis Libycis. Studies in Classics. Vol. 7. Translated by George W. Shea. Lampeter, Wales: Edwin Mellon Press. ISBN 0773482423. OCLC 39692299.
- Procopius – History of the Wars, Volume II Books 3–4. (Vandalic War). Cambridge, Mass.: Harvard University Press. 1914–1940. ISBN 9780674990906. "Books 3-4, translated by H. B. Dewing"
- Kazhdan, Alexander, ed. (1991). The Oxford Dictionary of Byzantium. Oxford and New York: Oxford University Press. ISBN 0-19-504652-8.

== Citations ==
=== Bibliography ===
- Bury, John Bagnell (1958) [1923]. History of the Later Roman Empire: From the Death of Theodosius I to the Death of Justinian, Volume 2. Mineola, New York: Dover Publications. OCLC 41478187.
- Diehl, Charles (1896). Byzantine Africa: History of Byzantine Domination in Africa (533-709). Paris: Ernest Leroux. OCLC 457835755.
- Hoyland, Robert G. (2015). In God's Path: The Arab Conquests and the Creation of an Islamic Empire. Oxford University Press. p. 79. ISBN 978-0-19-991636-8.
- Conant, Jonathan (2012). Staying Roman: Conquest and Identity in Africa and the Mediterranean, 439–700. Cambridge University Press. p. 303.
- Moderan, Yves (2003). The Moors and Roman Africa (4th–7th centuries). Publications of the French School of Rome (in French). Library of French Schools of Athens and Rome. ISBN 978-2-7283-1003-6.
- Modéran, Yves (1986). "Corippe et l'occupation byzantine de l'Afrique : pour une nouvelle lecture de la Johannide". Antiquités africaines. 22 (1): 195–212. doi:10.3406/antaf.1986.1131.
- Fentress Elizabeth and Wilson Andrew, "The Saharan Diaspora and the Southern Frontiers of Byzantine North Africa", in Conant, P., Jonathan, and Stevens T., Susan (eds), North Africa under Byzantium and Early Islam, Washington, Dumbarton Oaks Research Library and collection Trustees for Harvard University, 2016, 322p.
- Pringle, R. Denys, Sixth-century fortifications in Byzantine Africa vol.1, DPhil. University of Oxford, 1979, 346p.
- Richardot, Philippe (2009). "La pacification de l'Afrique byzantine 534 – 546". Stratégique. 93-94 – 95-96 (1): 129–158. doi:10.3917/strat.093.0129.
