= Battle of Sufetula (546 or 547) =

6th-century battle in Africa

- Part of the Moorish wars
Date	546/547
Location	near Sufetula, Byzacena, Byzantine Empire (now Sbeitla, Tunisia)
Result	Byzantine victory

Belligerents
Byzantine Empire; Pro-Roman Berbers	Berbers • Laguatan • Frexes • Ifuraces

Commanders and leaders
John Troglita; Putzintulus; Geiserith; Cutzinas; Ifisdaïas; Bitiptès son of Ifisdaïas	Antalas (surrendered); Ierna (executed); Carcasan; Bruten

Casualties and losses
Unknown	Unknown

The Battle of Sufetula took place in either late 546 or early 547, at Sufetula in Byzacena, a province of Byzantine Empire, in what is now Tunisia during the Moorish uprisings against the Byzantines. It was fought by Byzantine forces led by John Troglita with Berber allies, against Moorish rebels led by Antalas. The battle resulted in a crushing Byzantine victory: the Berbers suffered heavy losses, and the battle-standards lost at the battle of Cillium in 544 were recovered by the Byzantines.

== Background ==
In late 546, when John Troglita reached Carthage, the situation was dire: the imperial troops, under Marcentius the dux of Byzacena and Gregory the Armenian in Carthage, were few in number and demoralized. They held out in the coastal cities, blockaded by the Moors of Byzacena under their chieftain Antalas, while the Leuathae and Austurae tribes from Tripolitania were raiding Byzacena with impunity. Diplomatic efforts, however, secured the allegiance of the Moorish leaders Cutzinas and Ifisdaias, who joined the imperial army with several thousand of their men. In addition, the tribesmen of the Aurès Mountains under Iaudas withdrew to Numidia on learning of Troglita's arrival and pursued a course of armed neutrality.

Upon his arrival in Carthage, Troglita reorganized his troops, bolstering the local forces with the veterans he had brought with him – mostly horse archers and cataphracts – and marched out to meet the rebels. At Antonia Castra, emissaries from Antalas presented themselves, but Troglita rejected their terms and imprisoned them. The Byzantine army marched into Byzacena, relieved the beleaguered cities, and joined up with Marcentius. The Moors, taken by surprise by the imperial army's swift advance, withdrew again to the mountainous and wooded interior, where they gathered their forces under the leadership of Ierna of the Leuathae and Antalas. Corippus suggests that they hoped that Troglita would not maintain his pursuit in the midst of winter and that they would have the advantage over the imperial army in this terrain. Troglita encamped near the Moorish positions and dispatched an envoy, Amantius, to bring Antalas his terms: the general offered amnesty in exchange for submitting to imperial authority again.

== Battle ==
Corippus narrates the subsequent battle at length, but his imitation of Virgilian verse provides little concrete detail: it is clear that it was a long, indecisive, and bloody conflict, which probably took place to the south or east of Sbeitla in late 546 or early 547. Eventually, the Byzantines prevailed and drove back the Moors, breaking through their defenses and storming their camp. According to Corippus, Ierna, who was the chief priest of the god Gurzil, was killed while trying to protect an image of the god. Many other tribal leaders fell, and the remainder scattered. The remains of the Tripolitanian tribes abandoned Byzacena, and Antalas was forced to lay down arms. In addition, many prisoners were released from the Moorish camp, and among the treasures captured there were the military standards lost by Solomon at Cillium in 544. These were dispatched to Constantinople, while Troglita held a triumphal entry into Carthage.

== Aftermath ==
Despite the victory, the war kept raging, and the berber chieftain of the Ifuraces (a migrating tribe from Marmarica) along with various other chieftains such as Bruten, took control of the remainder of rebel coalition's armies. He inflicted a heavy defeat on the Byzantine forces at the Battle of Marta, but he was later decisively defeated in the Battle of the Fields of Cato, ending the Berber revolts and (temporarily) pacifying the Berbers of North Africa.

== Sources ==
- Bury, John Bagnell (1958) [1923]. History of the Later Roman Empire: From the Death of Theodosius I to the Death of Justinian, Volume 2. Mineola, New York: Dover Publications. OCLC 41478187.
- Diehl, Charles (1896). L'Afrique Byzantine. Histoire de la Domination Byzantine en Afrique (533–709) (in French). Paris, France: Ernest Leroux.
- Martindale, John R., ed. (1992). The Prosopography of the Later Roman Empire: Volume III, AD 527–641. Cambridge: Cambridge University Press. ISBN 0-521-20160-8.
