= Battle of Thacia =

Byzantine battle in modern Tunisia, 545

- Part of the Moorish wars
Date	Autumn 545
Location	Thacia, modern day Tunisia
Result	Berber victory

Belligerents
Byzantine Empire	Kingdom of the Dorsale; Mauro-Roman Kingdom

Commanders and leaders
Areobindus; Artabanes; John the Armenian †	Antalas; Stotzas †

Strength
Unknown; Reinforced with Armenian contingents	Unknown

Casualties and losses
Heavy	Unknown

The Battle of Thacia took place in the autumn of 545, in Thacia (now Bordj Messaoudi, in Tunisia). The Byzantine loyalists led by John the Armenian confronted the Berber rebel Antalas and his ally Stotzas, a renegade Byzantine. In the clash, the outnumbered Byzantines were defeated and John was killed, but not before mortally wounding Stotzas. The Byzantine rout triggers a crisis in Carthage.

== Background ==
After the death of the governor of Carthage, Solomon, in the Battle of Cillium against Antalas, his nephew Sergius, who had inflicted arrogant treatment on the Laguatans tribe and provoked the rebellion of the Berbers, was appointed governor in Africa. Emperor Justinian sent his military commander Areobindus to share command with Sergius. Meanwhile, the leader of the Berber rebels Antalas joined forces with Stotzas, a renegade Byzantine soldier who had led an unsuccessful rebellion against Byzantine Carthage a few years earlier.

== Battle ==
In 545, Areobindus sent a general named Artabanes along with his brother John the Armenian to confront the rebels at Thacia. Unfortunately, the army was considerably outnumbered by the rebel forces as Sergius had refused to send reinforcements. Since John and Stotzas were longtime personal enemies, they began what would eventually be a fatal duel. According to the account of Procopius of Caesarea, the two commanders come out of their ranks and ran against each other. When Stotzas advanced, John fired an arrow at him that landed in the right groin. Stotzas was seriously injured but was still able to breathe. After having placed their failing chief at the foot of a tree, the Berber and Byzantine renegade soldiers of Stotzas launched a general assault against John and his troops, and put them to flight. John's horse crashed downhill, throwing him to the ground. While trying to get back onto the saddle, he was captured by the rebels, and killed.

== Consequences ==
With the defeat at Thacia, Justinian realized that the dual command system of Africa was harmful. In the fall of 545, Sergius was relieved and Areobindus replaced him. Areobindus was assassinated in March 546 by the dux of Numidia, Guntarith, who took his place. Guntarith was himself assassinated two months later.

== Bibliography ==
- Procopius of Caesarea (1852). History of the Vandal War (in French). Paris: Firmin-Didot.
