= Battle of Marta =

Military battle between Berber tribes and forces of John Troglit at Marta (Tunisia)

Battle Of Marta
Date	Summer Of 547
Location	Mareth, Tunisia
Result	Berber victory

Belligerents
Berbers • Laguatan • Frexes • Ifuraces	Byzantine Empire

Commanders and leaders
Carcasan • Antalas	John Troglita; Cutzinas; Putzintulus; Geisirith; Sinduit

Strength
Unknown	Unknown

Casualties and losses
Unknown	Heavy

The Battle of Marta was a military confrontation between a coalition of rebellious Berber tribes led by Carcasan and the forces of John Troglita and his Berber ally Cusina, at Marta (current-day Mareth, Tunisia), in the summer of 547. It followed a significant Byzantine victory through which John Troglita managed to suppress the Berber rebellion led by Antalas. However, in this instance, the Berber rebels managed to re-organize and prevail, although the pacified Moors later contributed to the victory that the Byzantines experienced at the Battle of the Fields of Cato, which Procopius mentioned as unexpected.

== Background ==
After the conquest of the Vandal Kingdom in 534, the Byzantine Empire restored Roman rule over North Africa, but it quickly faced resistance from Berber tribes concerned about their autonomy. Following several more or less suppressed uprisings, a major rebellion erupted in 543, jeopardizing the Byzantine position in Africa. In 546, Emperor Justinian dispatched John Troglita to take control of the province, weakened by divisions and the incompetence of Byzantine leadership. Successfully forming an alliance with Cusina, a Berber chief, and engaging in a pitched battle against the rebel coalition led by Antalas, Troglita achieved a significant success upon his arrival.

However, the rebellion was not completely suppressed. In Tripolitania, Carcasan, the leader of the Ifuraces, became the leader of the Libyan tribes after the death of Ierna, who was the priest of Gurzil and leader of the Libyans. He went to join Antalas who migrated to the south, launching raids into Roman Africa. Meanwhile, the Byzantines were weakened by the departure of a portion of their troops to Italy to participate in the war against the Goths. In reality, of the nine regiments, only six remain, and Ifisdaïas withdrew his support for Troglita. The rebels' territory was arid, and mounting a Byzantine expedition was complicated by the lack of supplies. In the midst of summer, the shortage of water and food became apparent, leading to a mutiny among the Byzantine troops.John Troglita had to hastily retreat towards the coast, but adverse winds prevented the support fleet from approaching. Simultaneously, the Berber rebels also faced a shortage of supplies as their numbers exceeded the capacity of local oases. Soon, they were spotted by Byzantine scouts, and John Troglita pursued them with the support of Cusina, before establishing his camp at Marta.

== Battle ==
The battlefield was divided by a river that separated the two armies. John Troglita ordered his light troops to hold the downstream of the river, thwarting any attempts at crossing through the use of projectile weapons. The Byzantines launched a disorderly charge and managed to drive the Berber rebels from the riverbanks. The rebels' retreat sparked martial enthusiasm among the Byzantines and their Berber allies. Nevertheless, John hesitated in advancing further. He arranged his army to be prepared for any eventuality, organizing it into three corps. On the left wing were the Berbers led by Cusina, in the center were General John Troglita and the infantry phalanxes, and on the right wing was the Byzantine cavalry with Putzintulus, Geisirith, and Sinduit. John had hesitated in committing the army, following the advice of his escort officers, the domestic protectors. Finally, influenced by the counsel of two Byzantine officers, he decided to initiate the battle without knowing the arrangement of his adversary. The Berber rebels had taken refuge in wooded terrain, hindering the handling of the Byzantine phalanx's pikes and favoring surprise attacks by the rebels. Soon, the Byzantines were vulnerable to the rebels' attacks, taking advantage of their adversaries' lack of mobility.

Carcasan mobilized the bulk of his troops, and launches a counter-attack that overwhelmed the Byzantines. Cusina panicked first and left the battlefield, triggering the Byzantines' retreat. John Troglita, while intervening personally to revive the courage of his troops, saw his horse shot from under him and was surrounded. He thus had to free himself with his sword. He then proceeded to reform his combat groups and retreated while fighting, hard pressed by the rebels. He crossed the river again, retreated along the coast, reaching the port of Iunci (Younga). Finally, he found refuge behind the walls of Laribus for the winter.

== Aftermath ==
This defeat was a setback for John Troglita, who had embarked on a campaign to eradicate the Berber rebellion. However, his defeat was mitigated by his ability to organize the retreat of his troops and avoid the annihilation of his army. According to Corippus, the author of "La Johannide," an epic dedicated to John Troglita and the primary account of the battle, the defeat was explained by the nature of the terrain and the numerical superiority of the Berbers. Finally, he attributed the success of the Byzantine retreat to the Berbers' inability to organize an effective pursuit, as they were hindered by the size of their herds. After their victory, Procopius notes that the Berber rebels extended their raids to the walls of Carthage and "exercised horrible cruelties on the inhabitants of the country."

Antalas, upon learning of the victory of the rebels, immediately rises and joined the Tripolitanian tribes the following year. On the other hand, John Troglita manages to rally several Berber leaders, including Cusina, Ifisdaïas, and Iaudas, enabling him to achieve a decisive victory at the Battle of the Fields of Cato and it brought an end to the Berber rebellion.
