= Battle of Sufetula =

Battle of Sufetula can refer to:

- Battle of Sufetula (546 or 547) between Byzantines and Moors
- Battle of Sufetula (647) between Byzantines and Arabs
