= Ierna =

- High priest of Gurzil; Leader of the Laguatan
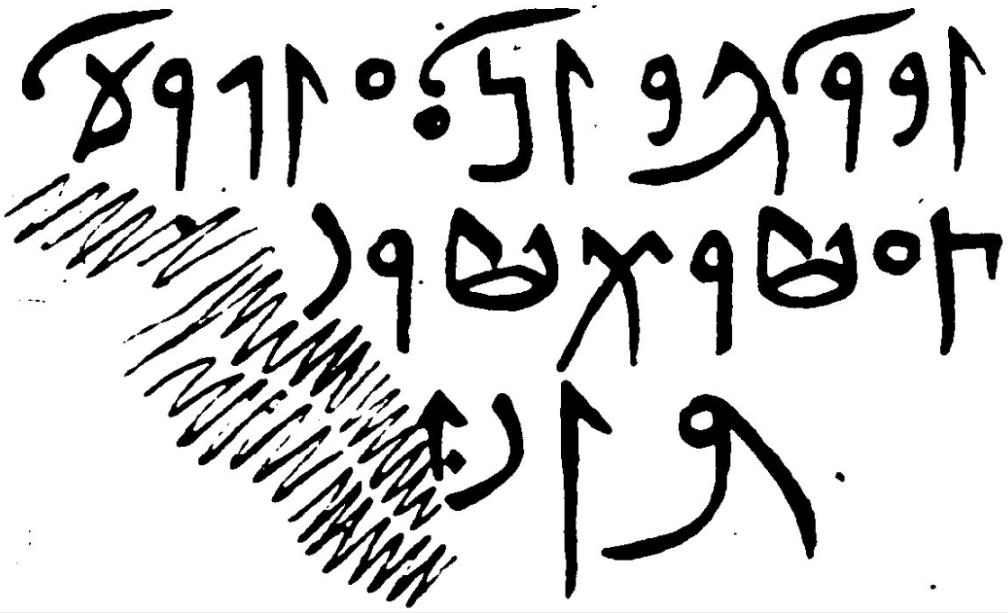
- Gurzil inscription found in Leptis Magna, an area where Ierna is said to have been active

Rebel leader
- Reign: 546–547
- Predecessor: John?
- Successor: Carcasan
- Died: early 547; Sufetula
- Berber: ⵉⵔⵏⴰ
- Religion: Berber traditional religion

Ierna (d. 547) was a Berber tribal leader of the Laguatan and also high priest of the god Gurzil who was active in the praetorian prefecture of Africa during the Moorish Wars of the mid-sixth century.

Apparently he led the Laguatan at the Battle of Cilium in 544, when the Byzantine governor Solomon was killed and many Byzantine soldiers were captured.

In the winter of 546/547, he served as second-in-command in the army of Antalas, another tribal leader in revolt. He fought in the battle that caused the Berber defeat before the troops of John Troglita. This defeat near Suffetula at the beginning of 547 resulted in: the disappearance of Antalas in the shadow of the night says corippus, the fleeing of Ierna with the image of Gurzil (which made him lose his time rather than securing himself at good time properly), being later captured and killed, and the image destroyed. Carcasan succeeded him in power in charge of the coalitions of tribes from sahara and Libya in the coalition he was already the commander of the left wing during the battle of Sufetula.

== Sources ==
- Martindale, John Robert; Jones, Arnold Hugh Martin; Morris, J., eds. (1992). The Prosopography of the Later Roman Empire, Volume III: A.D. 527–641. Cambridge: Cambridge University Press. ISBN 978-0-521-20160-5.
