= Antalas =

- Chieftain of the Frexenses

King of the Dorsale
- Reign: c.517 – after 548
- Predecessor: Guenfan
- Born: c. 500; Byzacena
- Father: Guenfan
- Occupation: Tribal chief
- Military career
- Conflicts: Berber raid on the Vandal Kingdom: Battle of the Great Dorsale; Vandalic War Byzantine–Moorish wars: Battle of Cillium; Battle of Thacia; Battle of Sufetula; Battle of Marta; Battle of the Fields of Cato

Antalas (Greek: Ἀντάλας; c. 500 – after 548) was a Berber tribal leader who played a major role in the wars of the Byzantine Empire against the Berber tribes in Africa.

Antalas and his tribe, the Frexes of which the Frechich who occupy the Algerian-Tunisian borders between Kasserine and Thala have retained the original name. Initially they served the Byzantines as allies through the foedus treaty, but after 544 switched sides due to Byzantines officials breaking the agreements by killing his brother Guarizila and cutting the annona subsides made as a tribute for peace and cooperation with others advantages of special citizenship notably for military services done by his people confederated to the empire during the war with the Vandals, whom started because of the Frexes and Antalas victory against king Hilderic army which provoked a coup by Gelimer alienating Justinian and giving him the casus belli for claiming africa for the eastern roman empire. Later the Frexes and their leader Antalas made a rebellious confederation with the Luwata (Basically original name of the Laguatan who were at the same time victim of similar treatements to Antalas and his people), Iforas and multiples tribes and even alliances with deserters such as Stotzas or usurpers such as Guntharic against the empire.

With the final Byzantine and imperial contingents of federated Berbers Ifisdaias (with his son Bitiptes), Cutzinas, Iabdas (with his son Bezina) victory in 548 made him and his tribe once again returning to their past situation of foederati while the saharans ones such as Luwata and Iforas were chased from the imperial territories. The main sources on his life are the epic panegyric poem Iohannis (in the honour of John Troglita) of Flavius Cresconius Corippus and the Histories of the Wars of Procopius of Caesarea historian of the byzantine imperial court also author of the Anecdota (also called Secret History) explaining more of the tyrannic issues inside the empire notably Nika massacres and the issues of the province of Africa resulting to the rebellion of the deserter Stotzas and the Frexes ruler Antalas during the rule of Justinian Ist the Emperor contemporary of Antalas.

== Life ==
Antalas was born c. 500, and was the son of a certain Guenfan, according to Corippus. He belonged to Frexes tribe of Byzacena (modern central Tunisia). Corippus reports that Antalas career began at the age of seventeen, stealing sheep. He soon gathered a cohort of followers around him and became a brigand, fighting against the Vandals. By 530, he had become leader of the Berbers in Byzacena, and in the same year led them to a decisive victory against the Vandals which resulted to the demise of King Hilderic and a crisis with the Byzantines due to that coup.

=== Antalas' Rebellion ===
Following the Vandalic War (533–534) and the capture of the Vandalic Kingdom by the Byzantine Empire, Antalas became an ally of the empire, receiving subsidies and supplies in exchange. In 543, however, a revolt broke out among the Berbers of Byzacena, which resulted in the execution of his brother Guarizila and the cessation of the subsidies by the Byzantine governor, Solomon. This treatment alienated Antalas, and when the Leuathae rebelled in Tripolitania in the next year, he and his followers joined them. The united tribes inflicted a heavy defeat on the Byzantines in the Battle of Cillium, where Solomon himself was killed.

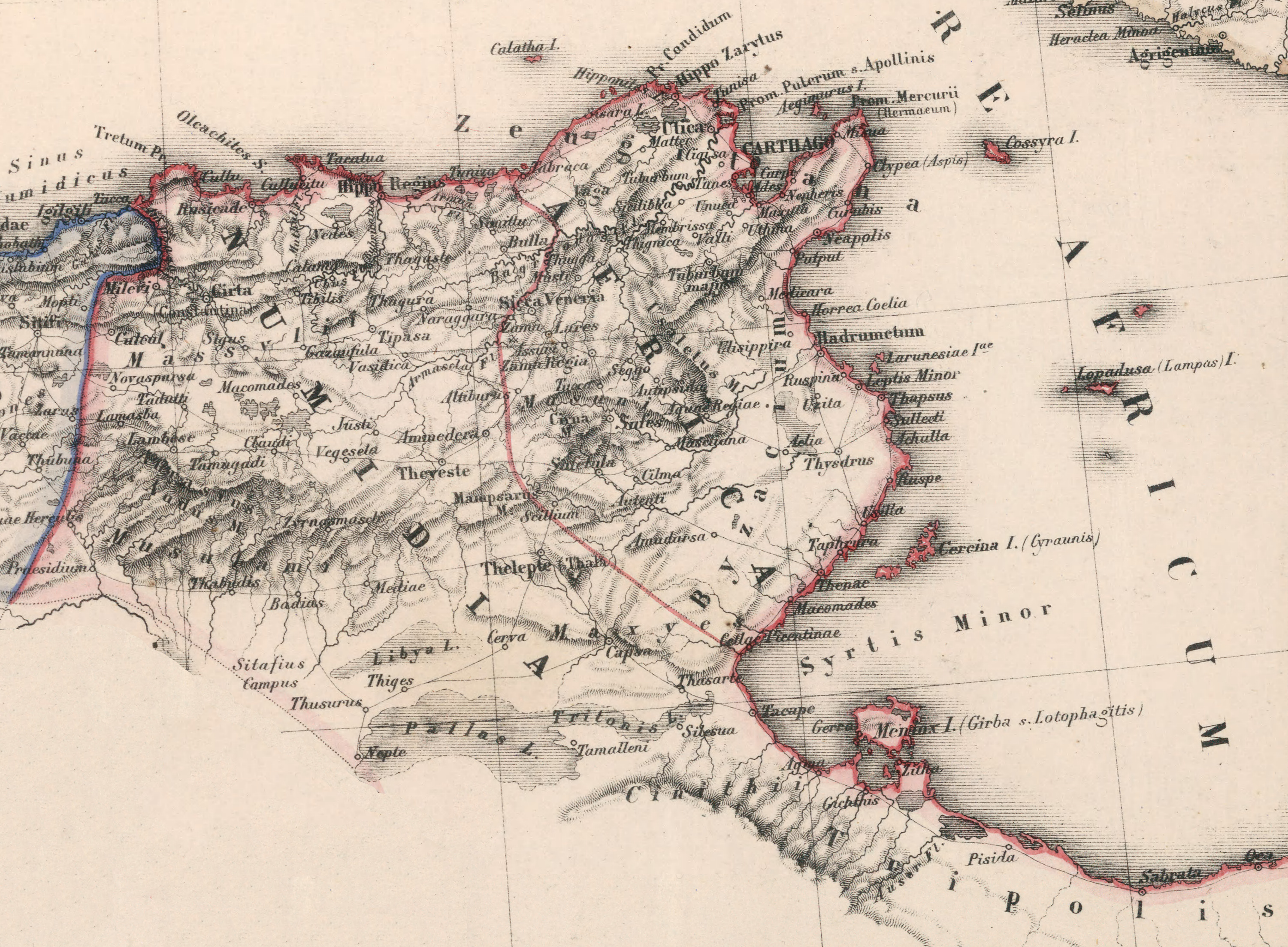
Roman and Byzantine Africa, with the provinces of Byzacena, Zeugitana and Numidia

With the death of the capable Solomon, his nephew Sergius, whose arrogant treatment of the Leuathae had prompted their rebellion in the first place, was appointed governor in Africa. Stotzas, a renegade Byzantine soldier who had led an unsuccessful rebellion a few years earlier, now joined Antalas from his refuge in Mauretania. Antalas wrote to the Byzantine emperor, Justinian I, asking for Sergius' dismissal, but in vain. Justinian only dispatched the patrician Areobindus in early 545 to share command with Sergius, but both were militarily incompetent and spent their time bickering with each other. While Sergius remained inactive at Carthage, Antalas and Stotzas led their troops north and managed to trick Himerius, the commander of Hadrumetum (today modern Sousse, Tunisia and back then called Justianopolis in the honour of Emperor Justinian I Justiniano in latin meaning Justinian and Polis in greek meaning city because the city was a very important economic center as was byzacena the province it managed), into leaving the town with his troops and rendezvous with another Byzantine commander, John. Himerius fell into the trap, and while his soldiers mutinied and joined Stotzas, he was forced to betray Hadrumetum to save his life. Finally, in late 545 Areobindus ordered the reluctant John to advance and meet the joint army of Antalas and Stotzas, which was encamped at Sicca Veneria. John's troops were considerably outnumbered by the rebel forces, and in the Battle of Thacia his army was routed and he himself was killed, but not before mortally wounding Stotzas in a duel.

After the defeat at Thacia, Sergius was relieved and Areobindus replaced him. At this time, the ambitious Byzantine dux of Numidia, Guntharic contacted the various Berber leaders in a bid to unseat Areobindus. Antalas was promised the rule of Byzacena, half the treasure of Areobindus and 1,500 Byzantine troops as his command. In order to increase pressure on Areobindus, the Berbers and the renegade followers of Stotzas approached Carthage. At the same time, Areobindus himself had secret contacts with another Berber leader, Cutzinas, leader of the Numidian Berbers. Cutzinas had promised to murder Antalas once battle was joined, but Guntharic revealed this plan to Antalas. In the event, due to Areobindus' timidity, a battle did not take place; in March Guntharic seized Carthage and murdered Areobindus.

Now master of Carthage, Guntharic refused to honour his agreement with Antalas, and the latter withdrew his men into Byzacena. There, in an effort to reconcile himself with the emperor, he contacted the dux of Byzacena, Marcentius, who had fled to an offshore island, proposing to make common cause against Guntharic. Guntharic sent an army under Cutzinas and Artabanes against Antalas and defeated him, but it is say by procopius that Artabanes blamed his troops ardor against the ennemy and it in fact betrays another part of the story told only by Corippus who by giving the word to Antalas in his poetry the Iohannis mention that there was another alliance of Antalas (allowing the murder and demise of Guntharic) with a Byzantine dignitary but again Artabanes as Guntharic and as Solomon before him all betrayed the agreements initially made with Antalas angering him, Corippus reports this through a witness of the war the military tribune called Caecilid and others witnesses. Guntharic himself was murdered soon after (May 546) by a conspiracy headed by Artabanes, and Carthage and the army returned to the Empire's allegiance. Justinian now sent an experienced soldier, John Troglita, to impose order on the troubled African provinces. Gathering his forces, Troglita marched out of Carthage into Byzacena. Antalas sent an embassy to the Byzantine general, but the latter rejected his demands and imprisoned the envoys. Shortly after, he sent an emissary of his own, who placed Antalas before the choice of battle or immediate submission. Antalas refused to submit, and the two armies confronted each other near Sbeitla in Byzacena in late 546 or early 547. The battle resulted in a crushing Byzantine victory: the Berbers suffered heavy losses, and the battle-standards lost at Cillium were recovered by the Byzantines.

In the summer, however, Antalas joined the Berbers of Tripolitania (though he is not mentioned by Corippus, Procopius records his presence) and inflicted a heavy defeat on Troglita at the Battle of Marta. After their victory, the Berbers raided even to the outskirts of Carthage. In the next year, Antalas again joined the Tripolitanian Berbers, under their leader Carcasan, when they invaded Byzacena. In contrast to the impetuous Carcasan, Antalas advocated a more cautious scorched earth tactic when Troglita marched forth to meet them. Nevertheless, when the two adversaries met later in the summer in the Battle of the Fields of Cato, the result was a decisive Byzantine victory: Carcasan fell, and the Berber revolt was crushed as Antalas and the surviving leaders submitted to Troglita. Nothing further is known of him after that.

== Sources ==
- Camps, G. (1988-04-01). "Antalas". Encyclopédie berbère (in French) (5): 706–708. doi:10.4000/encyclopedieberbere.2518. ISSN 1015-7344.
- Bury, John Bagnell (1958) [1923]. History of the Later Roman Empire: From the Death of Theodosius I to the Death of Justinian, Volume 2. Mineola, New York: Dover Publications. OCLC 41478187.
- Martindale, John Robert; Jones, Arnold Hugh Martin; Morris, J., eds. (1992). The Prosopography of the Later Roman Empire, Volume III: A.D. 527–641. Cambridge: Cambridge University Press. ISBN 978-0-521-20160-5.
