= Siege of Carthage (536) =

Siege of Carthage by rebels in AD 536

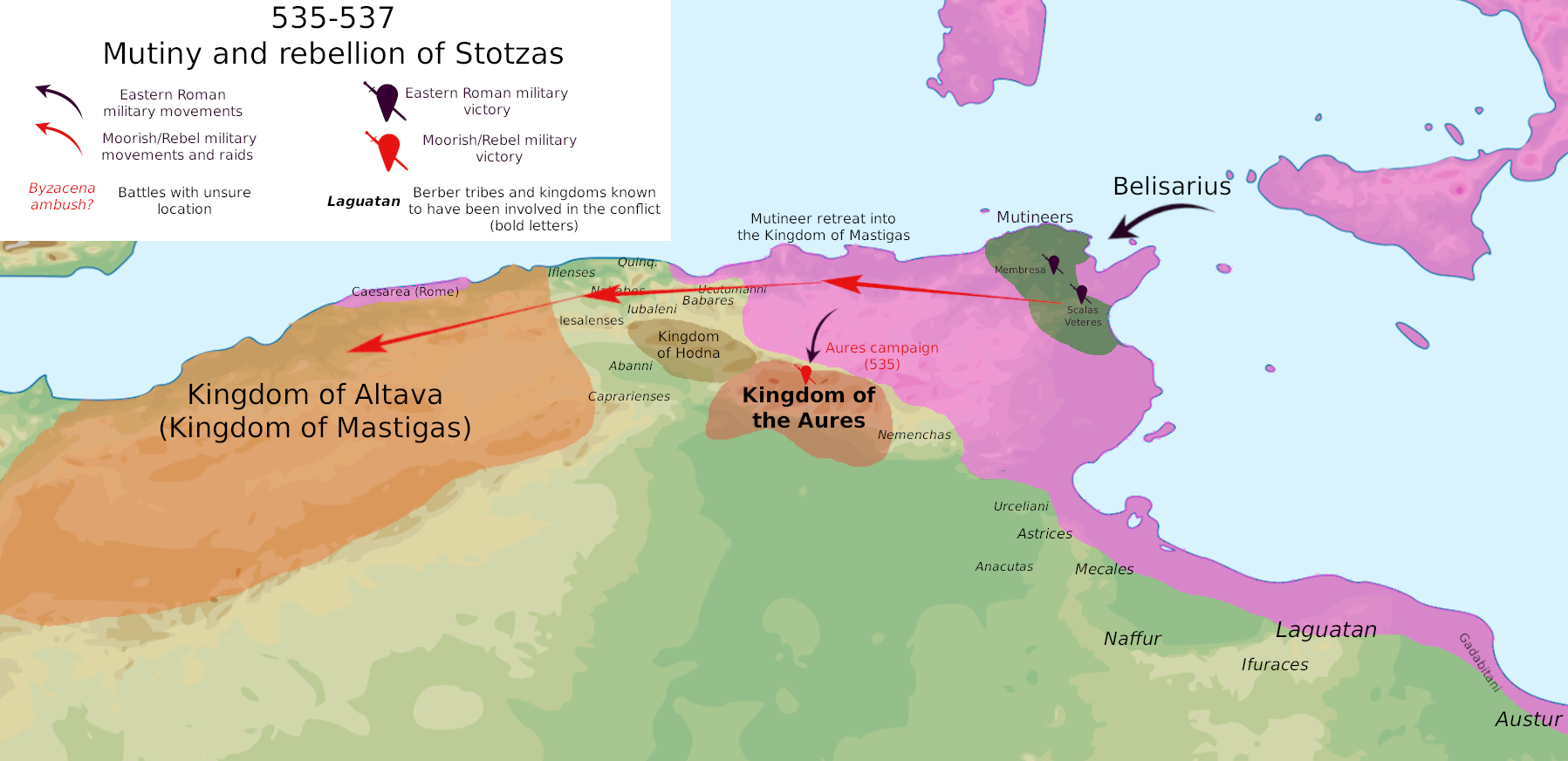
- Mutiny against Solomon and the restoration of order
Date	c. Easter 536
Location	Carthage, Tunisia
Result	Byzantine victory

Belligerents
Byzantine Empire	Mutineers

Commanders and leaders
Belisarius; Solomon	Stotzas

Strength
2,100	9,000

The Siege of Carthage took place in c. Easter 536, when dissatisfied Byzantine soldiers revolted against Solomon, the ruler of the Praetorian prefecture of Africa.

The administration of Byzantine North Africa was under the magister militum Solomon, after Belisarius had conquered the Vandal Kingdom in the Vandalic War of 534. Discontent soon spread among the army as soldiers demanded lands through their Vandal wives and unpaid salaries, while religious restrictions on Arian troops intensified the unrest. In Easter 536, a conspiracy to assassinate Solomon collapsed, prompting the conspirators to revolt. Solomon fled Carthage and sought Belisarius in Sicily. The rebels, led by Stotzas, besieged Carthage until Belisarius arrived with a small force in spring 536. The rebels withdrew but Belisarius, while outnumbered, pursued them and defeated them near the Bagradas River. Despite the victory, after the departure of Belisarius, the revolt spread as more detachments of the Byzantine army in Numidia joined Stotzas. The Emperor Justinian dispatched General Germanus to suppress the rebellion.

== Background ==
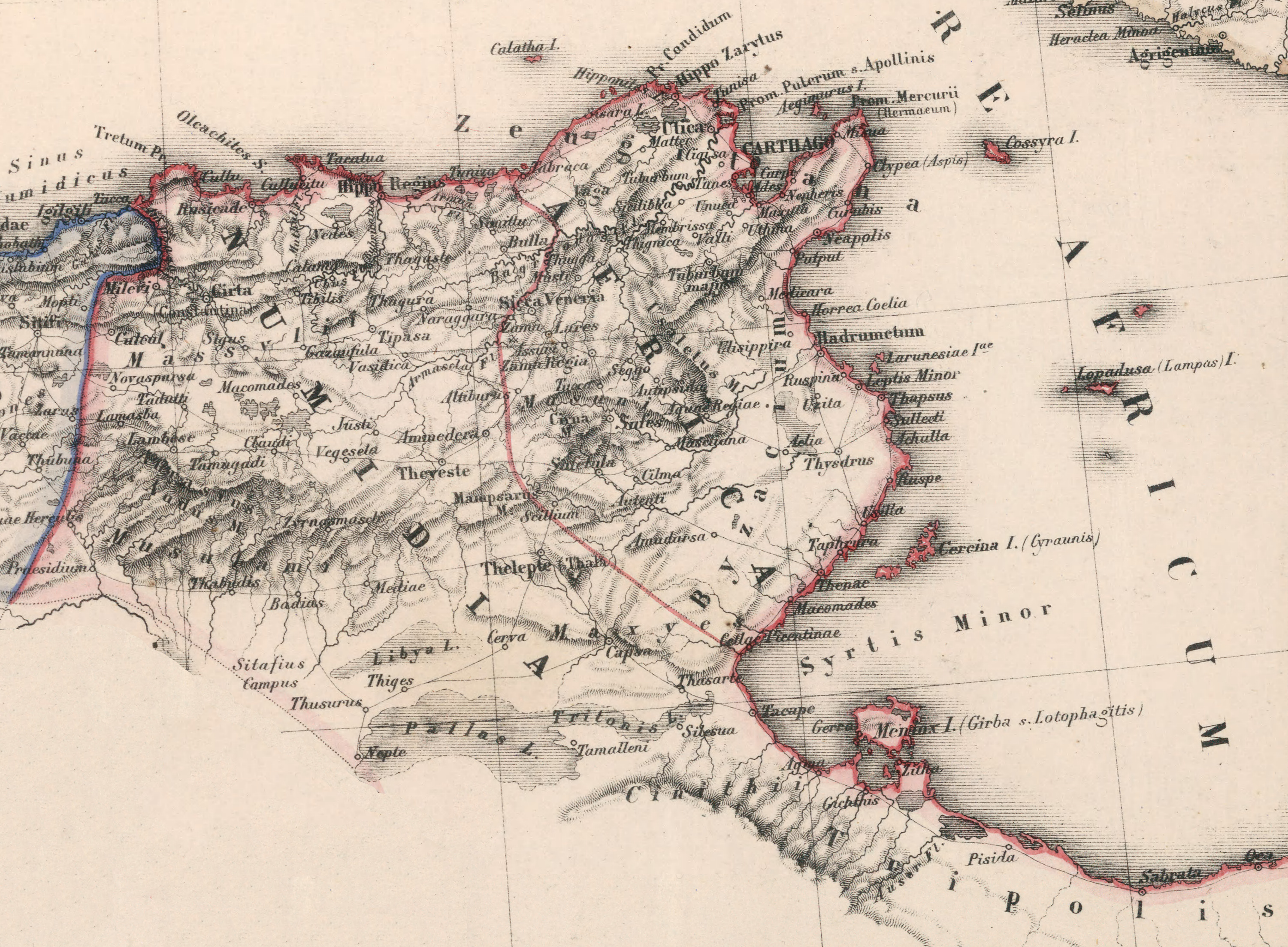
Roman Africa, with the provinces of Byzacena, Zeugitana and Numidia

Following the victory of Belisarius in the Vandalic War in 534, he returned to Constantinople, where the emperor, Justinian, made preparations against the Ostrogothic kingdom in Italy, in what became known as the Gothic War. In 535, Belisarius invaded the Ostrogothic lands and captured Sicily. Byzantine soldiers who took part in the Vandalic War had married Vandal women, often widows or daughters of men killed or displaced during the conquest. These women encouraged their husbands to claim back their lost properties. Solomon, the administrator of Byzantine North Africa, and Justinian refused, because these estates had either become imperial property or had been restored to their prior owners from the time before Vandal rule. Resentment grew as senior Byzantine officers amassed wealth in comparison to ordinary soldiers, who had not even received their salaries.

Religious tensions also fueled discontent. Around 1,000 soldiers, including Heruls, followed Arian Christianity but were forbidden from practising their faith. Vandal clergy encouraged them to rebel. Frustration peaked during Easter 536, when they were prohibited from baptizing their children or openly worshipping. Four hundred Vandals, being transported east, mutinied and escaped to Libya and then joined forces at Mount Aurasium and Mauretania. Their success emboldened dissatisfied troops in Carthage, who had started to conspire against Solomon.

The conspirators intended to assassinate Solomon during church services. The plot remained secret because many of Solomon's bodyguards, household troops and servants participated, seeking to recover lands belonging to their Vandal wives. Those responsible for protecting Solomon had become the conspiracy's leading supporters. Even Procopius, who was responsible for gathering intelligence, remained unaware. Ultimately, the conspirators lost their nerve and abandoned the plot. Arguments between the conspirators exposed them, prompting them to flee the city and begin plundering the countryside, while those who remained denied any involvement.

When Solomon learned of the unrest, he appealed to the remaining troops for loyalty. Instead, they gathered in the hippodrome and denounced him. Solomon sent Theodorus the Cappadocian to negotiate, but the soldiers instead proclaimed him their commander, suggesting he had sympathized with the conspiracy. The rebels seized the palace, killed supporters of Solomon, looted wealthy households and continued their violence until drunkenness ended the day's fighting. Solomon escaped by taking refuge in a church, where the military commander Martinus and Procopius joined him. They fled during the night to the harbour with assistance from Theodorus and escaped by ship to Misuas (the shipyard of Carthage). Solomon then dispatched Martinus to secure support in Numidia and entrusted Theodorus with administering Carthage before sailing with Procopius to Syracuse, Sicily, where Belisarius was stationed.

== Military actions ==
=== Siege ===
The rebels who fled Carthage gathered on the plain of Bulla and elected Stotzas, one of Martinus's former guards, as their leader. He united around 8,000 rebels and was joined by more than 1,000 returning Vandals and numerous runaway slaves seeking freedom. Stotzas marched on Carthage but Theodorus and the city garrison remained loyal to the emperor. Theodorus sent Joseph, a member of Belisarius's household and presumably one of his intelligence agents, to negotiate with the rebels. When Joseph demanded that Stotzas end the revolt, Stotzas had him executed and began besieging the city. In spring, Belisarius and Solomon arrived at Carthage with 100 men at dusk. The following day, the rebels, who expected the defenders of the city to surrender, learned about the arrival of Belisarius, prompting them to lift the siege and flee.

=== Battle of the Bagradas River ===
Belisarius assembled a cavalry force of 2,000 men, whose loyalty was secured with generous payments. He pursued the retreating rebels and caught them near the city of Membresa. Both armies established camps on opposite sides of the Bagradas River. By occupying the riverbank, Belisarius denied the rebels easy access to water. Before the battle, both leaders encouraged their troops, with Belisarius emphasising discipline and loyalty while Stotzas appealing to the rebels' new freedom. As the armies advanced, a strong wind blew into the rebels' faces, which gave an advantage to Belisarius's mounted archers. When Stotzas attempted to redeploy his line, his men did not manoeuvre in order, allowing Belisarius to launch a sudden attack. The disordered rebels were caught off guard and panicked. They fled toward Numidia, suffering relatively light losses, because Belisarius lacked the manpower to pursue them.

== Aftermath ==
The Byzantines captured the abandoned rebel camp, including its wealth and women, and distributed them among the troops. Belisarius arranged for Theodore and Ildiger (a commander whom Belisarius trusted) to govern Carthage until Justinian appointed a successor and he ensured that Solomon was away from North Africa for a while. Soon after he departed for Sicily, where his presence was needed, the situation in North Africa deteriorated. Despite the defeat, the rebels did not submit. Troops sent to block Stotzas's retreat and stationed in Numidia, declared their support for him. This resulted in the defection of nearly two-thirds of the Byzantine army in Africa to the rebel cause. Justinian sent general Germanus to suppress it. Stotzas continued to lead the rebellion against the Byzantines until his death in 545.
