= John (Mauro-Roman king) =

Rebel leader
- Reign: 545–546
- Predecessor: Stotzas
- Successor: Eventually Garmul
- Died: spring 546; Constantinople (modern-day Istanbul, Turkey)
- Cause of death: Crucifixion
- Burial: Likely Pelagion, Constantinople (Note: The Pelagion was a recognized place of burial for executed criminals in Constantinople where the remains, after cremation were usually thrown into common graves. Such was also the case for the late emperor Phocas after his execution by Heraclius.)
- Greek: Ἰωάννης (Iōannēs); Στότζας ο Νεότερος (nickname)
- Religion: Christianity

John (Greek: Ἰωάννης, romanized: Iōannēs), referred to as John the Tyrant and sometimes given the nickname Stotzas the Younger (Latin: Stutias Iunior) after his predecessor, Stotzas, was a Berber military leader. Given his name, Ioannes, John was probably, like Stotzas, of Eastern Roman descent and only briefly commanded his army against the Eastern Roman Empire.

== Biography ==
=== Reign ===
After the defeat of Stotzas, John was chosen by the combined Berber-Eastern Roman rebel army and he supported the Vandal restoration attempt of dux Numidiae Guntarith, who seized the province of Africa proconsularis in spring 546 and killed the imperial governor Aerobindus in Carthage. Subsequently, with Antalas’s return to imperial allegiance, John hastened to join Guntharic.

In Carthage, he received orders to accompany Artabanes, Ulithaeus, and the Berber leader Cutzinas in pursuit of Antalas into Byzacena. During the mission, however, he remained stationed with Ulithaeus and a portion of the army in their camp near Hadrumetum, while Artabanes and Cutzinas were chasing Antalas.

When Guntarith began to consolidate his regime with purges and mass executions, the strategos Artabanes managed to have Guntarith assassinated just five weeks after the rebellion began. Meanwhile upon returning to the provincial capital, John allegedly went to Pasiphile’s residence on the night of Guntharic’s assassination. Once he learned of the incident, he met with Vandals and took refuge in a church.

=== Death ===
The Byzantine chroniclers Procopius of Caesarea and Count Marcellinus record that he apparently he only agreed to leave the church once he had received a guarantee that he would life from Artabanes.Despite that, he was chained and arrested by Artabanes and sent in chains to Constantinople, where he was said to have been crucified in spring 546.
