= Berber raid on the Vandal Kingdom =

529 military raid

Date	529 or 530
Location	Byzacena
Result	Berber Victory

Belligerents
Kingdom of the Dorsale	Vandal Kingdom

Commanders and leaders
Antalas	Hilderic; Hildimer

Strength
Unknown	Unknown

Casualties and losses
Unknown	Unknown

In 529 or 530, a Berber army under Antalas led a military expedition into the south of Byzacena. He defeated an army of the Vandal Kingdom under the command of Hildimer, which precipitated a coup against King Hilderic.

== Background ==
Under the reign of Guenfan, the Frexes were still a small and relatively weak kingdom. Nevertheless, his son Antalas, who was then serving as a general in his father’s army, began hostilities against the Vandals as early as 516.

He launched raids against King Thrasamund in the valleys and mountains of southern Byzacena, which met with great success. After succeeding his father as leader of the Frexes in 517, Antalas decided to launch a larger-scale expedition against King Hilderic.

== Expedition ==
Antalas, leading the Frexes and allied with Naffur contingents, ravaged several cities and pillaging the countryside of southern Byzacena, provoking a reaction from the Vandal king, who decided to send his nephew Hildimer to confront Antalas' army. The latter decided to send his army to stop the advance of the Berber troops.

However, the Vandals army fell into an ambush: it was quickly trapped in a wooded area, without supplies, and overwhelmed by stifling heat. The difficult terrain prevented the Vandal cavalry from maneuvering effectively. Hilderic’s army suffered a crushing defeat, allowing the Berbers to continue pillaging the region.

== Aftermath ==
Following this defeat against Antalas’s forces, discontent grew within the Vandal kingdom. On 15 May 530, a coup d'état was carried out by Gelimer, a cousin of Hilderic. He overthrew the reigning king and had Hilderic, along with his principal nobles, imprisoned.

This shift in power marked a turning point in the history of the Vandal Kingdom and hastened the intervention of the Byzantine Empire in North Africa, under the pretext of restoring the legitimate king.
