= Carcasan =

6th-century Berber leader of the Ifuraces

- Leader of the Ifuraces

Rebel leader
- Reign: 547–548
- Predecessor: Ierna
- Successor: Eventually Garmul
- Died: spring 548; Thacia
- Religion: Christianity

Carcasan was a libyan leader of the Marmarid tribes that resided in Tripolitania and was active during the Berber insurrections in the Praetorium Prefecture of Africa in the mid-6th century. He first appears in the reports of General John Troglita's campaign in the winter of 546/547, when he was defeated with Antalas and other Berber leaders by Byzantine troops. In the spring of 547, after the death of the Laguatan chief Ierna, he united the scattered Berber tribes and was acclaimed as a leader by them. After consulting the oracle of Amon, he resumed the war against the Byzantines and inflicted a heavy defeat on them during the Battle of Marta

In the spring of 548, he and Antalas clashed again with John and his ally Cusina. The Berber troops in revolt marched against John Troglita and camped in the plain of Mammès. Carcasan, confident after his victory last year, wishes to confront John's army immediately, but he gives way to Antalas, who advocates a more cautious tactic, withdrawing and luring the Byzantines inland, forcing them to march away from their supply bases, and across the devastated country, with the aim of exhausting and demoralizing them. The Berber rebels put Antalas' tactics into practice, but when they camped in the plain of Caton's fields, in Latara, they decided to fight in pitched battle. In the ensuing confrontation, the Byzantines and their Berber allies were victorious and Carcasan, during a counterattack, was killed by Jean Troglita himself according to Corippe.
