= Stotzas =

- King of Altava

King of the Mauro-Roman Kingdom
- Reign: 541–545
- Predecessor: Mastigas
- Successor: John
- Died: 545; Thacia
- Spouse: Mastigas’ daughter
- Greek: Στότζας or Τζότζας
- Religion: Christianity

Stotzas (Greek: Στότζας), also Stutias, Theophanes writes him Tzotzas (Τζότζας), was an East Roman (Byzantine) soldier and leader of a military rebellion in the Praetorian prefecture of Africa in the 530s. Stotzas attempted to establish Africa as a separate state and had been chosen by the rebelling soldiers as their leader. Nearly succeeding in taking Carthage, Stotzas was defeated at the Battle of the River Bagradas by Belisarius and fled into Numidia, where he regrouped. After another attempt at taking control of Africa, Stotzas was defeated by Germanus in 537 and fled with some of his followers into Mauretania.

In Mauretania, Stotzas would marry the daughter of a local noble and would allegedly be raised to King in 541. He followed the Berber king Antalas in his rebellion against Eastern Roman rule in 544. In the Battle of Thacia in autumn of 545, Stotzas would be mortally wounded by the Eastern Roman general John, dying shortly thereafter.

== Biography ==
=== Eastern Roman rebel ===
Stotzas served as a bodyguard of the general Martinus in the army under Belisarius that had conquered the Vandal kingdom in Africa in 533–534. In 536, a military mutiny broke out in the Byzantine army in Africa against its leader, Solomon. The rebels chose Stotzas to lead them, and aimed to expel the imperial loyalists and establish Africa as a separate state, ruled by themselves. Stotzas marched against the capital, Carthage, with an army of 8,000 men, joined by at least a thousand surviving Vandals and several escaped slaves. He besieged the city, which was on the point of surrendering when Belisarius suddenly arrived from Sicily. Stotzas lifted the siege and retreated to Membresa, where his army was defeated by Belisarius. The rebels fled into Numidia, where Stotzas persuaded most of the Byzantine garrison to join him, after murdering their officers; according to the historian Procopius, at this point two thirds of the Byzantine army in Africa had gone over to the rebel camp.

Belisarius had to return to Italy to prosecute the war against the Ostrogoths, but he was replaced by Emperor Justinian's able cousin Germanus in late 536. Germanus's policy to win over the disaffected troops with promises of pardon and the payment of their arrears was successful, and a large part of the rebels went over to him. Hence, Stotzas resolved to force a decision, and marched against him in spring 537. The two armies met at Scalas Veteres, and Stotzas, abandoned by many of his allies, was defeated.

=== Mauretania ===
Stotzas was able to flee with a handful of followers to Mauretania, where he was welcomed, given the daughter of a local prince in marriage, and allegedly raised to king in 541. It believed that this local prince was actually Mastigas who Stotzas potentially succeeded as Mauro-Roman king. In 544, however, he and the Moorish king Antalas rebelled against Byzantine rule. Stotzas and his men joined Antalas, but were attacked by the general John in autumn 545, despite being heavily outnumbered. In the ensuing Battle of Thacia, John was able to inflict a mortal wound on Stotzas, although he too fell soon after.

Regnal titles
Preceded by Mastigas	King of the Moors and Romans; 541–545	Succeeded by John
