= John Troglita =

Byzantine general

- Died: c. 552
- Military career
- Allegiance: Byzantine Empire
- Rank: magister militum
- Conflicts: Vandalic War; Lazic War; Moorish Wars

John Troglita (Latin: Ioannes Troglita, Greek: Ἰωάννης Τρωγλίτης) was a 6th-century Byzantine general. He participated in the Vandalic War and served in North Africa as a regional military governor during the years 533–538, before being sent east to the wars with the Sassanid Persians. As dux Mesopotamiae, Troglita distinguished himself in several battles, and was noticed by agents of the Byzantine emperor, Justinian I (r. 527–565). In summer 546, Justinian chose John Troglita to assume overall command of Byzantine forces in Africa, where a succession of revolts by the indigenous Moorish tribes and within the imperial army itself had seriously reduced the Byzantine position. Troglita quickly secured an initial victory in the winter of 546/547 against the Moors of Byzacena, but was defeated in summer 547 by the tribes of Tripolitania, and Africa was once again laid open to destructive raids. Troglita reorganized his army and secured the assistance of some tribal leaders, and confronted and decisively defeated the tribal coalition at the Fields of Cato in summer 548. This victory spelled the end of the Moorish revolt and heralded an era of peace for Africa. Troglita was also involved in the Gothic War, twice sending some of his troops to Italy to assist against the Ostrogoths.

John Troglita's exploits, especially against the Moors in Africa, are the subject of the last Latin epic poem of Antiquity, the Iohannis, seu de Bellis Libycis ("Tale of John, or On the Libyan War") of Flavius Cresconius Corippus, which is the main source on his life.

== Origins ==
The exact origins of John Troglita are unclear. He may have been born in Thrace, but his peculiar surname might indicate provenance from Trogilos (Greek: Τρώγιλος) in Macedonia. According to information provided by the 6th-century historian Procopius of Caesarea and Troglita's panegyrist Flavius Cresconius Corippus, he was the son of a certain Evanthes, and had at least one brother named Pappus. Troglita himself married a "daughter of a king", probably a barbarian chieftain, and had a son, Peter.

== Early career in Africa and the East ==
John Troglita is first mentioned as having participated in the Vandalic War (533–534) under Belisarius, and may be identifiable with another John, who commanded a unit of foederati in the battles of Ad Decimum and Tricamarum. His brother, Pappus, was killed during this war, in the early stages of the Byzantine invasion. Troglita remained in the province of Africa after Belisarius's departure in 534, and participated in the expeditions of Solomon against the Moors in 534–535. At the time, he was probably the local military governor (dux) in either Byzacena or, more probably, Tripolitania, for he is mentioned as leading successful expeditions against the Leuathae tribe. Troglita also fought against the rebel Stotzas' army, participating in the first victory under Belisarius at Membresa in 536, and then, under Solomon's successor Germanus, in the decisive battle at Scalas Veteres in spring 537. In this battle, he was one of the commanders of the cavalry on the Byzantine army's right wing, which according to the historian Procopius was defeated and driven off by Stotzas's men, losing its standards in the process. Nevertheless, the battle resulted in an imperial victory. In 538, Troglita distinguished himself in the Battle of Autenti, probably in the Byzacena.

At some point after 538, Troglita was sent to the Eastern frontier, where by 541 he was appointed dux Mesopotamiae, one of the most important military commands of the region. From this position, he arrested a member of the embassy sent by the Ostrogothic king Witiges to the Persians to incite them to attack Byzantium. When war broke out, according to Corippus John scored a number of successes against the Persian army: he defeated the general Nabedes near Nisibis, led his army in a successful night attack against the Persian force besieging Theodosiopolis, and then defeated another Persian army besieging Dara, capturing its general, Mihr-Mihroe. Procopius, however, gives a different account of the first battle, indicating that Troglita had to be saved from a sudden Persian attack by Belisarius, and does not mention the other two incidents at all. Nevertheless, Corippus maintains that John was congratulated for his performance by Urbicius, one of Emperor Justinian's advisors who had been sent to supervise the war.

== High command in Africa ==
During Troglita's absence from Africa, the situation had been turbulent. Germanus had remained in the province until 539, and succeeded in restoring discipline in the army and pacifying the core territories of Africa Proconsularis and Byzacena. He was succeeded by Solomon, who began his second tenure with great success, defeating the Moors of the Aurès Mountains and establishing control over Numidia and Mauretania Sitifensis. However, the Moorish revolt flared up again in 543, and Solomon was killed in the Battle of Cillium in 544. His successor, his nephew Sergius, was incompetent. He was defeated by the Moors, recalled and replaced with the senator Areobindus, who was murdered in spring 546 in another military revolt led by the general Guntharic. The latter intended to declare himself independent of Constantinople, but was soon murdered by the Armenian Artabanes. The need for a new and capable leader in Africa was apparent to Constantinople. After a truce was signed with Persia in 546, Emperor Justinian, perhaps, as Corippus implies, acting on Urbicius's advice, recalled Troglita from the East. After having him report on the situation there in Constantinople, the Emperor placed him at the head of a new army and sent him to Africa as the new magister militum per Africam in late summer 546.

=== Suppression of the Moorish revolt ===
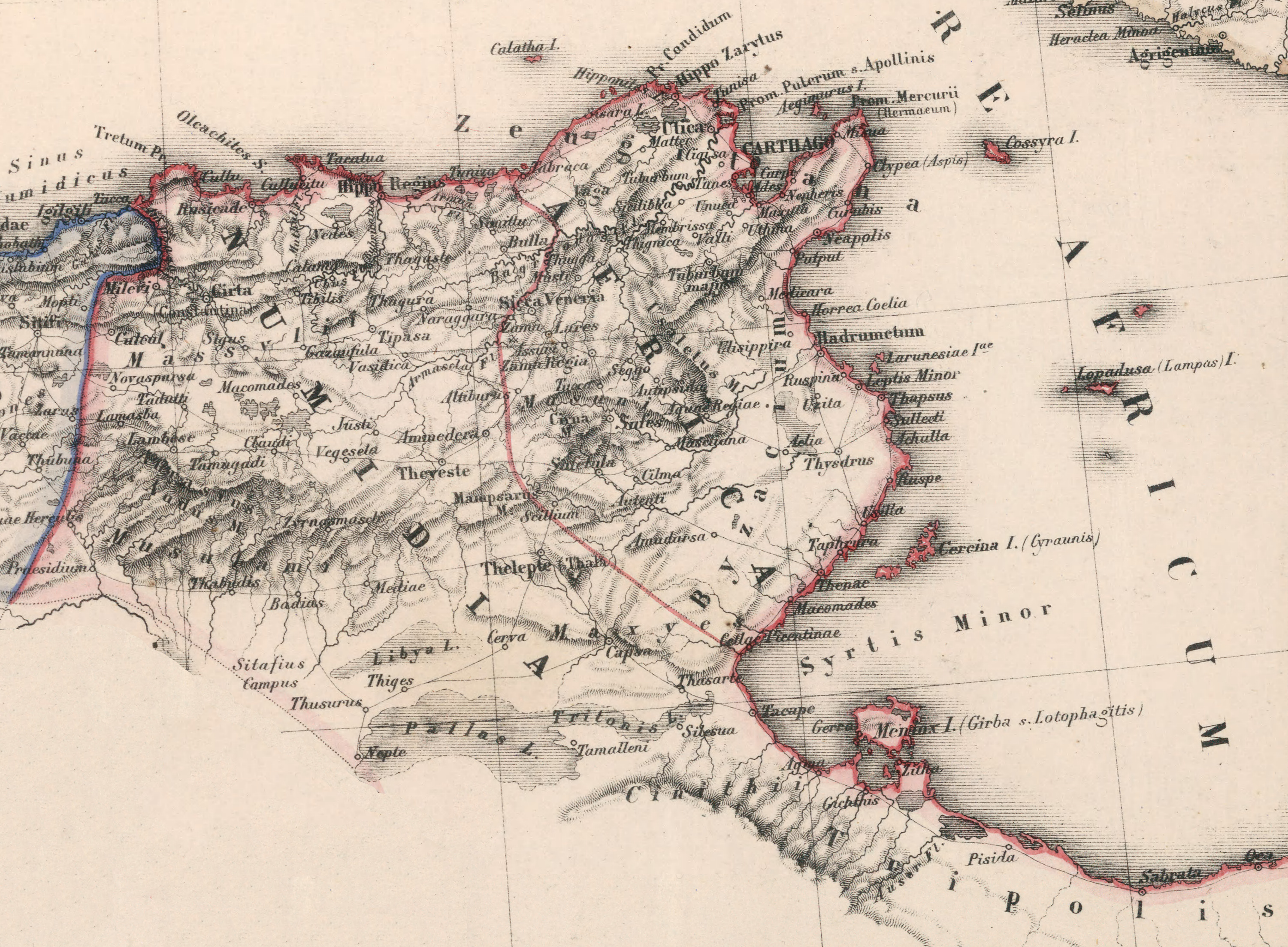
Roman Africa, with the provinces of Byzacena, Zeugitana and Numidia.

In late 546, when John Troglita reached Carthage, the situation was dire: the imperial troops, under Marcentius the dux of Byzacena and Gregory the Armenian in Carthage, were few in number and demoralized. They held out in the coastal cities, blockaded by the Moors of Byzacena under their chieftain Antalas, while the Leuathae and Austurae tribes from Tripolitania were raiding Byzacena with impunity. Diplomatic efforts, however, secured the allegiance of the Moorish leaders Cutzinas and Ifisdaias, who joined the imperial army with several thousand of their men. In addition, the tribesmen of the Aurès Mountains under Iaudas withdrew to Numidia on learning of Troglita's arrival and pursued a course of armed neutrality.

=== Defeat of Antalas ===
Upon his arrival in Carthage, Troglita reorganized his troops, bolstering the local forces with the veterans he had brought with him – mostly horse archers and cataphracts – and marched out to meet the rebels. At Antonia Castra, emissaries from Antalas presented themselves, but Troglita rejected their terms and imprisoned them. The Byzantine army marched into Byzacena, relieved the beleaguered cities, and joined up with Marcentius. The Moors, taken by surprise by the imperial army's swift advance, withdrew again to the mountainous and wooded interior, where they gathered their forces under the leadership of Ierna of the Leuathae and Antalas. Corippus suggests that they hoped that Troglita would not maintain his pursuit in the midst of winter and that they would have the advantage over the imperial army in this terrain. Troglita encamped near the Moorish positions and dispatched an envoy, Amantius, to bring Antalas his terms: the general offered amnesty in exchange for submitting to imperial authority again.

Corippus narrates the subsequent battle at length, but his imitation of Virgilian verse provides little concrete detail: it is clear that it was a long, indecisive, and bloody conflict, which probably took place to the south or east of Sufetula in late 546 or early 547. Eventually, the Byzantines prevailed and drove back the Moors, breaking through their defences and storming their camp. According to Corippus, Ierna, who was the chief priest of the god Gurzil, was killed while trying to protect an image of the god. Many other tribal leaders fell, and the remainder scattered. The remains of the Tripolitanian tribes abandoned Byzacena, and Antalas was forced to lay down arms. In addition, many prisoners were released from the Moorish camp, and among the treasures captured there were the military standards lost by Solomon at Cillium in 544. These were dispatched to Constantinople, while Troglita held a triumphal entry into Carthage.

=== Uprising in Tripolitania ===
With this victory, the war seemed won, and peace re-established in Africa. A few months later, however, the tribes of Tripolitania reassembled and formed a coalition under the king of the Ifuraces, Carcasan. After raiding Tripolitania, they turned west to raid Byzacena again. Notified of this by Rufinus, the dux of Tripolitania, Troglita marched out to meet them. The Byzantine army had been weakened in the meantime by the need to reinforce Belisarius against the Goths in Italy: of the nine regiments Troglita had brought with him from Constantinople, three were dispatched to Italy. The Moors under Antalas remained hostile but did not immediately join the conflict for the moment, but the Byzantines were deprived of the services of Ifisdaias, who refused to commit his men. Despite the hot summer, Troglita marched his men quickly to the southern limit of Byzacena, along the edge of the desert, hoping to meet the Moors there and prevent the long-suffering province from being ravaged again. The Moors initially withdrew into the arid interior, hoping to shake him off, but Troglita's army, accompanied by a caravan with water and provisions, followed them into the desert. Both armies suffered from thirst and hunger, and discontent spread among the Byzantine soldiers. Finally, a near mutiny erupted when an epidemic killed off a large part of the army's horses, forcing Troglita to turn again north towards the coast.

There, Troglita positioned himself between the Matmata plateau and the coast, and awaited the Moors. He also sent for ships to bring supplies, but adverse winds made this impossible. When the Moorish army appeared nearby it was likewise exhausted from hunger and made for some sources of water, which Troglita set out to reach first. The Byzantines camped at Marta in the district of Gallica, where battle was joined. It was a disastrous defeat for the Byzantines, whose army broke and fled. Corippus, possibly in an attempt to exculpate his hero Troglita, attributes the defeat to the indiscipline of some soldiers, who attacked the enemy before the army was ready, leading to a disorganized piecemeal engagement. According to Corippus's account, the Moorish allies of the Byzantines panicked first and retreated, causing the entire army to disintegrate, despite the personal intervention of Troglita and the other Byzantine leaders.

=== Renewal of the Moorish uprising in Byzacena ===
Following this defeat, Troglita fled to Iunci (modern Bordj Younga, 9 km south of Mahares), where he began regrouping the survivors. The losses were so high and the army's morale so low, however, that he was soon forced to withdraw further north to the fortress of Laribus (the modern village of Lorbeus, near Le Kef), where he started mustering his army. Learning of the battle, Antalas immediately rose up again and joined the Tripolitanian tribes, while the Byzantines' allies, Cutzinas and Ifisdaias, were quarreling among themselves. Throughout the remainder of 547, the Moors were free to raid across Africa, even reaching the vicinity of Carthage itself.

Troglita did not remain inactive: from Carthage, the praetorian prefect Athanasius and Troglita's young son organized reinforcements and supplies for the camp at Laribus, while Troglita himself succeeded not only in reconciling Cutzinas and Ifisdaias, but also in gaining the allegiance of King Iaudas and his tribe. In the spring of 548, Troglita, having regrouped his forces, met with his Moorish allies at the plain of Arsuris on the northern limits of Byzacena. Corippus gives extraordinary numbers for the native contingents provided by each chief: 30,000 for Cutzinas, 100,000 for Ifisdaias, and 12,000 under Iaudas's brother. Whatever the real numbers, it seems clear that Troglita's regular troops formed the lesser portion of the imperial army.

=== Final defeat of the revolt ===
The tribes, under the leadership of Carcasan and Antalas, had encamped in central Byzacena, in the plain of Mamma or Mammes. Carcasan, confident after his victory the previous year, wanted to confront the imperial army immediately, but as it happened he gave way to Antalas, who advocated the more cautious and well-tried Moorish tactic of withdrawing into the interior; if the Byzantines could be induced to follow, they would suffer an exhausting and demoralizing march through devastated country, far removed from their supply bases. The rebels thus retreated south and east, reaching Iunci after ten days. Troglita's army pursued them at some distance, only exchanging a few blows with the tribes' rearguard. Once the Byzantine army reached the plain before Iunci and laid camp, however, the Moors again withdrew into the mountainous interior. Having been informed by a spy of his enemy's strategy, Troglita refused to follow and remained encamped near the port of Lariscus, from where he could be easily resupplied. Nevertheless, discontent grew among the soldiers, who did not understand their leader's reluctance to fight: the army mutinied and attacked the tent of Troglita, who was barely able to escape. Thanks to the allied Moorish contingents, who remained steadfast, Troglita was able to reimpose control over his men.

Troglita now moved his army to confront the enemy, who were encamped at a plain called the Fields of Cato. The Moorish camp had been heavily fortified, and Troglita was reluctant to launch a direct assault. He, therefore, blockaded it, hoping that hunger would force the Moors to fight him in open battle. To further encourage them, he restrained his men, feigning a reluctance to fight. Troglita's plan worked: encouraged by sacrifices to their gods and hoping to catch the imperial army unprepared, the Moors attacked the Byzantine camp on a Sunday. The battle hung long in the balance, with many dead on both sides, but eventually the Byzantines gained the upper hand. At this point, Carcasan rallied his forces and launched a fierce counterattack, but was killed by Troglita himself. Seeing their leader fall, the Moors broke and fled. The battle was a resounding success for the Byzantines: seventeen of the Moors' principal leaders were dead, the Tripolitanian tribes were decimated and withdrew to the desert, and Antalas and his followers submitted to Troglita. Byzacena, Numidia, and Tripolitania were finally secured, and a period of peace was inaugurated that lasted for the next fourteen years, until 562.

=== Later activities ===
At about this time, Troglita seems to have been promoted to the honorific court rank of patricius, as attested by the 6th-century historian Jordanes (Romana 385). He remained in command in Africa for at least another four years, beginning the difficult work of reconstruction. Troglita re-established the civil administrative apparatus as originally envisaged by Emperor Justinian in 533, sharing his authority with the prefect Athanasius. The provincial fortifications built by Solomon were restored, and the subdued Moorish tribes carefully returned to a status of vassalage as imperial foederati. According to the scholar John B. Bury, Troglita's record in re-establishing order and tranquility in the troubled province make him, along with Belisarius and Solomon, "the third hero of the Imperial reoccupation of Africa".

Troglita's success in restoring peace to Africa can be seen from the fact that in late 551, when Totila, king of the Ostrogoths, captured Sardinia and Corsica, Troglita was able to spare enough forces and send a fleet to reclaim them, albeit without success. The exact date of Troglita's death is unknown, but it is most likely that he died in 552 or soon after.

== See also ==
- Structural history of the Roman military

== Sources ==
- Bury, John Bagnell (1958) [1923]. History of the Later Roman Empire: From the Death of Theodosius I to the Death of Justinian, Volume 2. Mineola, New York: Dover Publications. OCLC 41478187.
- Diehl, Charles (1896). L'Afrique Byzantine. Histoire de la Domination Byzantine en Afrique (533–709) (in French). Paris, France: Ernest Leroux.
- Martindale, John R., ed. (1992). The Prosopography of the Later Roman Empire: Volume III, AD 527–641. Cambridge: Cambridge University Press. ISBN 0-521-20160-8.
- Modéran, Yves (2003). "Jean Troglita". Encyclopédie berbère, Vol. 25: Iseqqemâren – Juba (in French). Aix-en-Provence: Edisud. pp. 3866–3870. doi:10.4000/encyclopedieberbere.1490.
- Pringle, Denys (1981). The Defence of Byzantine Africa from Justinian to the Arab Conquest: An Account of the Military History and Archaeology of the African Provinces in the Sixth and Seventh Century. Oxford, United Kingdom: British Archaeological Reports. ISBN 0-86054-119-3.
