= Kingdom of the Dorsale =

Political-military confederation

- Map of the Romano-Berber Kingdoms, according to the French historian Christian Courtois.
- Status: Berber tribal polity
- Common languages: Berber, African Romance Latin
- Government: Monarchy
- King
  - c.510-c.517: Guenfan
  - 6th century: Antalas
- Historical era: Medieval
Preceded by	Succeeded by
Vandal Kingdom	Umayyad Caliphate
- Today part of: Tunisia

The Kingdom of the Dorsale (also known as the Kingdom of the Grand Dorsale) was a political-military confederation of the Frexes and Naffur Berber tribes located in what is present-day Tunisia. This kingdom seems to have been established as a functional polity c. AD 510 by the Berber chieftain Guenfan. The tribes of the Dorsale soon came into conflict with the larger Vandalic Kingdom, and in 530, under the leadership of Guenfan's son Antalas, they defeated the Vandals at the Battle of Great Dorsale.

Following the Vandalic War (533–534) and the capture of the Vandalic Kingdom by the Byzantine Empire, Antalas became an ally of the empire, receiving supplies for his allegiance. In 543, however, a revolt broke out among the Berbers of Byzacena, which resulted in the execution of Antalas's brother Guarizila and the cessation of the subsidies by the Byzantine governor, Solomon. This treatment alienated Antalas, and when the Leuathae rebelled in Tripolitania in the next year, he and his followers joined them. The united tribes inflicted a heavy defeat on the Byzantines in the Battle of Cillium, where Solomon himself was killed.

== See also ==
- Romano-Berber kingdoms
