= Thacia =

Africa Proconsularis (125 AD).

Thacia was a Roman-Berber civitas in the province of Africa Proconsularis.

The city is known as the site of a battle in 545 AD. Forces led by the Berber King Antalas and the Byzantine general Stotzas fought against the troops of Solomon, the Prefect of Africa. The Berbers launched a general revolt and inflicted a severe defeat on the Byzantines in Thacia in 545 AD. Antalas, Stotzas and Solomon were all killed in the battle.
