= Laguatan =

Berber clan that lived in Cyrenaica during the Roman period

The Laguatan (Arabic: لواتة, romanized: Lawātah) was a Berber clan that inhabited the Cyrenaica area during the Roman period. They have been described as primarily raiders and nomadic, but others consider them a settled group who also raided.

== History ==
The Laguatan emerged in the late 3rd century, when the first groups started a westward migration from their original homes in the Libyan Desert. Under the label of Austuriani (probably reflecting a then-dominant sub-tribe) they are recorded as raiding the Cyrenaica and Tripolitania in the 4th century, and in the 520s, under their leader Cabaon, they scored a major victory over the Vandals during the Tripolitania expedition effectively gaining independence from them and seizing control over much of the region. In the 540s, they played a major role in the tribal wars against the Byzantines, until finally defeated by John Troglita. Procopius of Caesarea (Vandalic War II.21.2 & II.28.47) calls them the Leuathae (Greek: Λευάθαι), while Flavius Cresconius Corippus calls them Ilaguas and Laguantan. According to Corippus, they were still pagan, and worshipped Gurzil, who is identified as the son of Amun and of a cow (Iohannis II.109–110).

During the Islamic Middle Ages, Ibn Khaldun recorded that this tribal group were known as the Lawata, and was spread from the oases of Egypt's Western Desert through Cyrenaica, Tripolitania to south and central Tunisia and eastern Algeria.

== Bibliography ==
- Brogan, Olwen (1975). "Inscriptions in the Libyan alphabet from Tripolitania and some notes on the tribes of the region". In Bynon, J. & Bynon, T. (eds.). Hamito-Semitica: Proceedings of a colloquium held by the Historical Section of the Linguistics Association (Great Britain) at the School of Oriental and African Studies, University of London, on the 18th, 19th and 20th March 1970. The Hague: Mouton. pp. 267–289. OCLC 1884610.
- Mattingly, D. J. (1983). "The Laguatan: A Libyan Tribal Confederation in the Late Roman Empire" (PDF). Libyan Studies: Annual Report of the Society for Libyan Studies. 14: 96–108.
- Modéran, Yves (2003), Les Maures et l'Afrique Romaine (IVe-VIIe siècle) (in French), Ecole Française de Rome
- Sjöström, Isabella (1993). Tripolitania in Transition. Aldershot, England: Avebury. ISBN 1-85628-707-6.
- Wickham, Chris (2007). Framing the Early Middle Ages. London: Oxford University Press. ISBN 978-0-19-921296-5.
