= Aurès campaign (539) =

- Part of Byzantine–Moorish wars
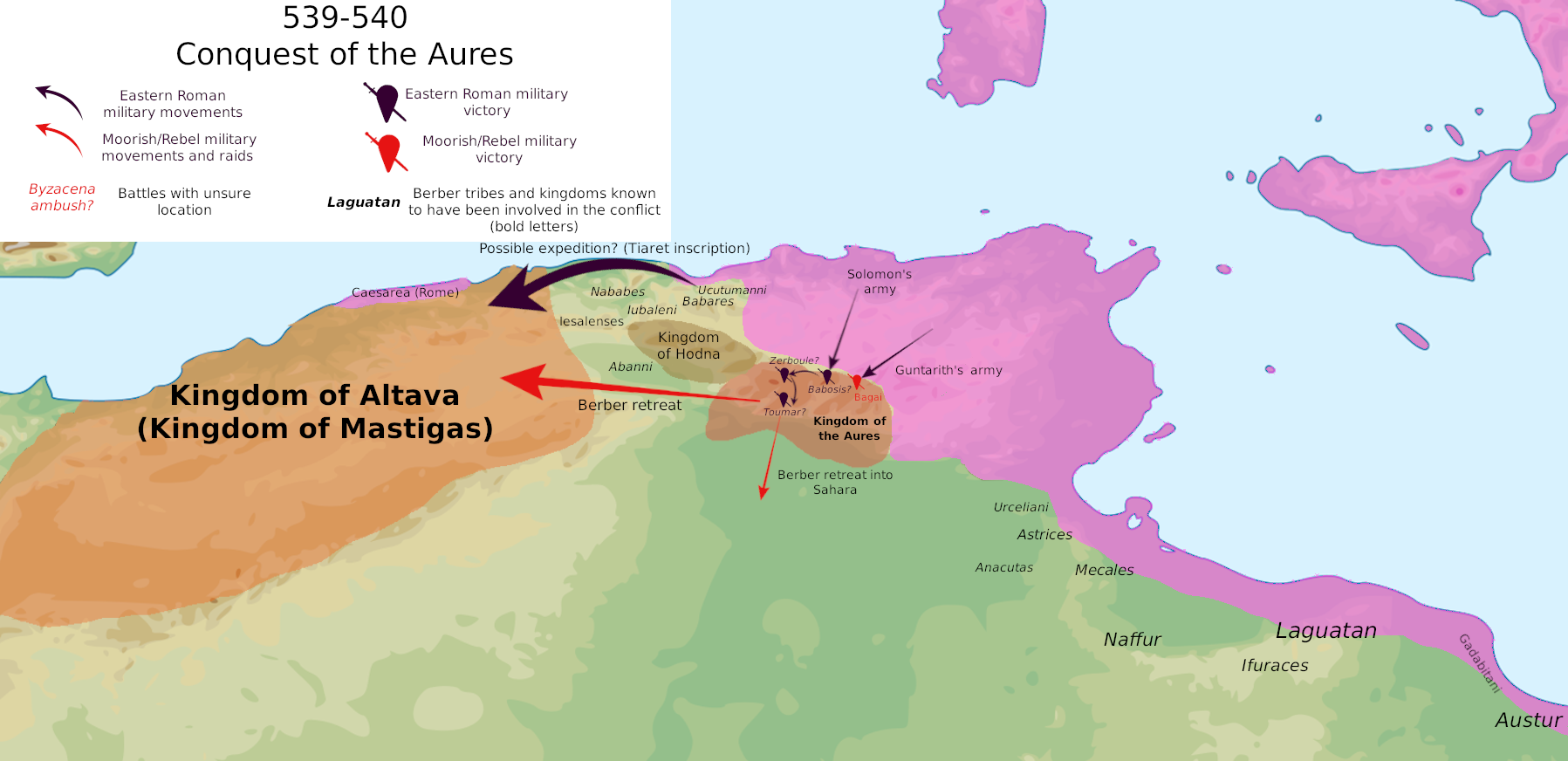
- Map of military movement and location of battles during the Aures campaign
Date	Summer of 539–540
Location	Aurès Mountains
Result	Byzantine victory: Berber leaders escape to the Mauro-Roman Kingdom
Territorial changes	Byzantine conquest of the Aurès region; Fall of the Kingdom of the Aurès

Belligerents
Byzantine Empire	Kingdom of the Aurès; Other Berbers

Commanders and leaders
Solomon; Guntarith; Ortaias	Iabdas (WIA); Cutzinas

The Aurès campaign of 539 was a military expedition led by the magister militum of Roman Africa, Solomon against the Berbers (referred to as "Moors" at the time) of the Aurès mountains, especially the Kingdom of the Aurès, during the Byzantine–Moorish wars. The area served as a refuge and a base of operation for Berber insurgents against Byzantine authority following the Berber defeat at the Battle of Bourgaon, protected by the Berber king of the Aures, Iabdas. The expedition resulted in a Byzantine victory, the conquest of the region, and the destruction of the Kingdom of the Aures, which would only be re-established after the disastrous Byzantine defeat at the Battle of Cillium.

== Background ==
The Byzantine-Moorish wars began in late 534 with the ambush of Aigan and Rufinus, two Byzantine commanders by Berber (Moorish) forces led by Cutzinas. In conjunction, the Kingdom of the Aures, led by Iabdas, began raids into the region of Numidia, devastating it., sacking several cities, and seizing important areas such as Thamugadi. Under the leadership of Solomon, the Byzantines then defeated the Berber rebels severely, first at the Battle of Mammes, then at mount Bourgaon, after which their leaders and their retinues escaped westwards into the Aures mountains. In 535 and the next year Solomon led a large expedition into the Aures to defeat Iabdas, however this was unsuccessful and Solomon had to retreat from the region, instead focusing on reinforcing the cities along the border. Solomon was temporarily dismissed, but re-appointed in 539, and he began immediate preparations to take the Aures and restore Roman control over all territory that has been lost to the Berbers during the collapse of the Roman empire.

== The Campaign ==
=== Initial Berber victories, Battle of Bagai ===
The Byzantine forces werre split in two by Solomon, one led by an officer of Vandalic origin called Guntarith and one led by himself. The Byzantine forces began the campaign by marching towards Bagai, once a bustling Roman city, now abandoned after a century of conflict between the Vandals and Berbers. Arriving there however the Berbers began an intense attack, defeating Guntarith and forcing him to retreat into a stockade which was then besieged. The force of Solomon immediately began moving to help the other army group, but the Berbers flooded the river Abigas (modern day Nahr bou Roughal), which was used for agricultural purposes previously and impeded Solomon's movement, before retreating back into the mountains into a place called "Babosis".

=== Battle of Babosis and the sieges of Zerboule and Toumar ===
Leaving the flooded Bagai, Solomon regrouped his army and moved its entirety towards Babosis. There he attacked the Berbers and decisively defeated them. Following the battle, many of the Berbers began fleeing, westwards into Mauretania Caesariensis (controlled at the time nearly fully by the Mauro-Roman Kingdom except for some of the eastern parts and the city of Caesarea, which had to be accessed by ships), and some of them leaving the mountains to go south into the Sahara. However Iabdas and his force of about 20,000 warriors, regrouped and retreated into the fort of Zerboule. Leaving a force there to guard the fort, Iabdas then fled further south into a fort built by himself on the summit of the Aures mountains called Toumar (possibly near modern Chelia). Meanwhile Solomon's forces secured the area of Timgad, and plundered the local villages. He then moved against the fort of Zerboule, besieging it, and using bows and arrows against the defenders as the primitive walls were not that high. The siege lasted for a couple of days, and as the Byzantines planned on retreating from the siege, the Berbers gave up and abandoned the fortress. The region where Iabdas retreated had very little water access and all wells were sabotaged by the Berbers to impede Solomon, however, while his army became more and more restless, Solomon delivered a speech to restore morale. The next day, according to Procopius, a small group began marching towards the Berbers without any order, and struck down 3 guards, and seeing their bravery, the rest of the army followed and assaulted the fort leaving many dead, and even wounding the Berber king Iabdas, who escaped westwards into the Mauro-Roman Kingdom.

== Aftermath ==
Following this victory Solomon reinforced fortifications across the Aures and restored control over Mauretania Sitifensis in 541, bringing the local kingdom of the Hodna, who had been allied to Solomon, under control as a tributary. Finding the wealth of Iabdas in an ancient tower at the "Rock of Geminianus", Solomon used the seized wealth to reinforce several forts. The Kingdom of the Aures was annexed fully into the Eastern Roman Empire. The campaign and its aftermath led to the apex of Byzantine control over Africa, and in the period between 541 and 544 the Byzantine province of Africa had reached its largest extent, controlling all territory in the region once owned by the Roman Empire with the exception of the Mauro-Roman Kingdom. In 544 this would however change, with a new phase of the Byzantine-Moorish wars beginning that would lead to the re-establishment of the Kingdom of the Aures, alongside the fall and restoration of Byzantine Africa.
