= Battle of Bourgaon =

Battle in Tunisia

- Part of Byzantine–Moorish wars
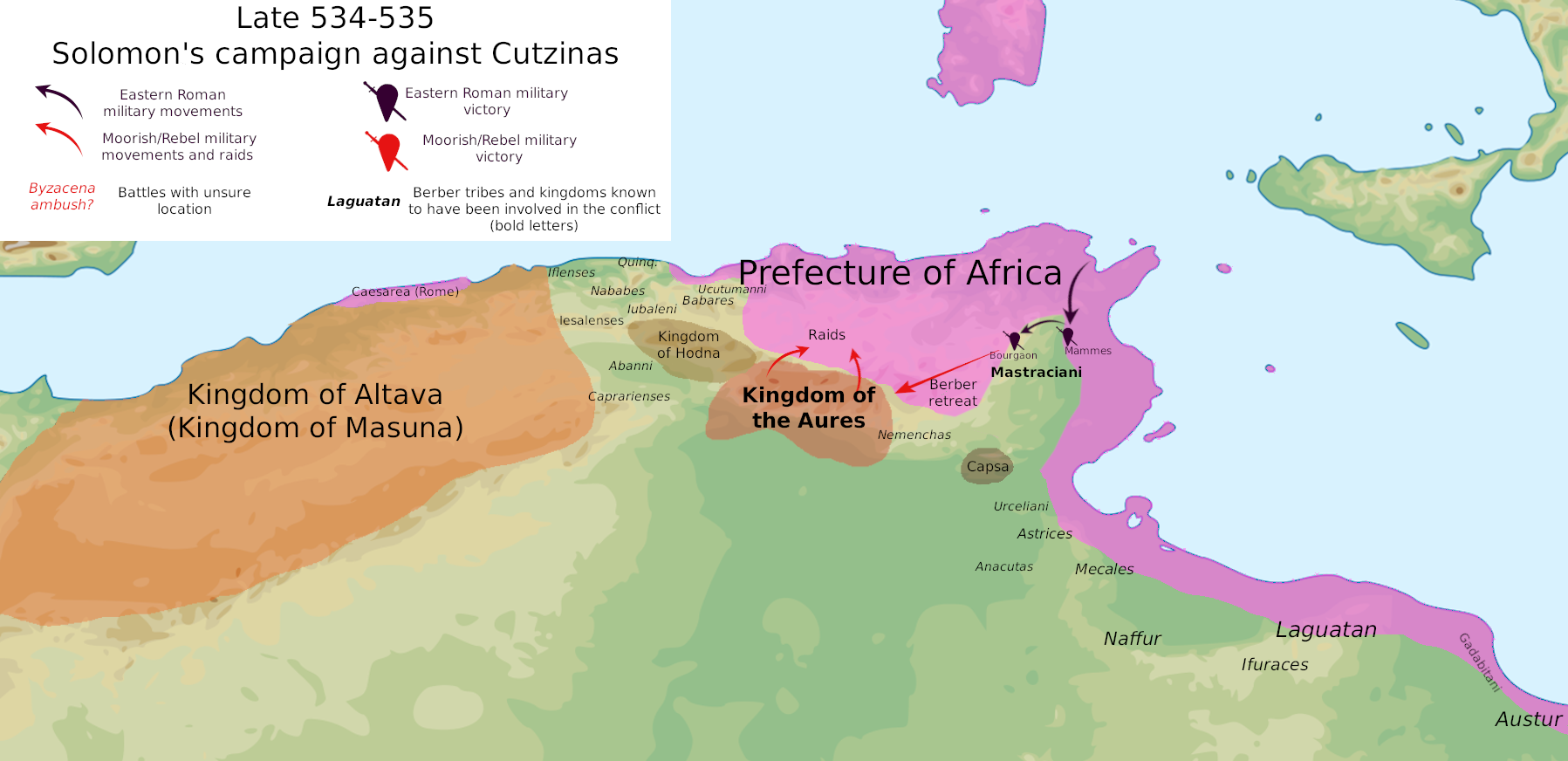
- Byzantine–Moorish campaigns
Date	535, during the summer
Location	Mount Bourgaon, (Note: The location of the mountain is unknown.) modern central Tunisia
Result	Byzantine victory

Belligerents
Byzantine Empire	Berber rebels

Commanders and leaders
Solomon; Theodorus	Cutzinas; Esdilasas (surrendered) (POW); Mesdinissas; Iourphoutes

Strength
Unknown	50,000

Casualties and losses
None (Note: These numbers are based on Procopius's claims.)	50,000

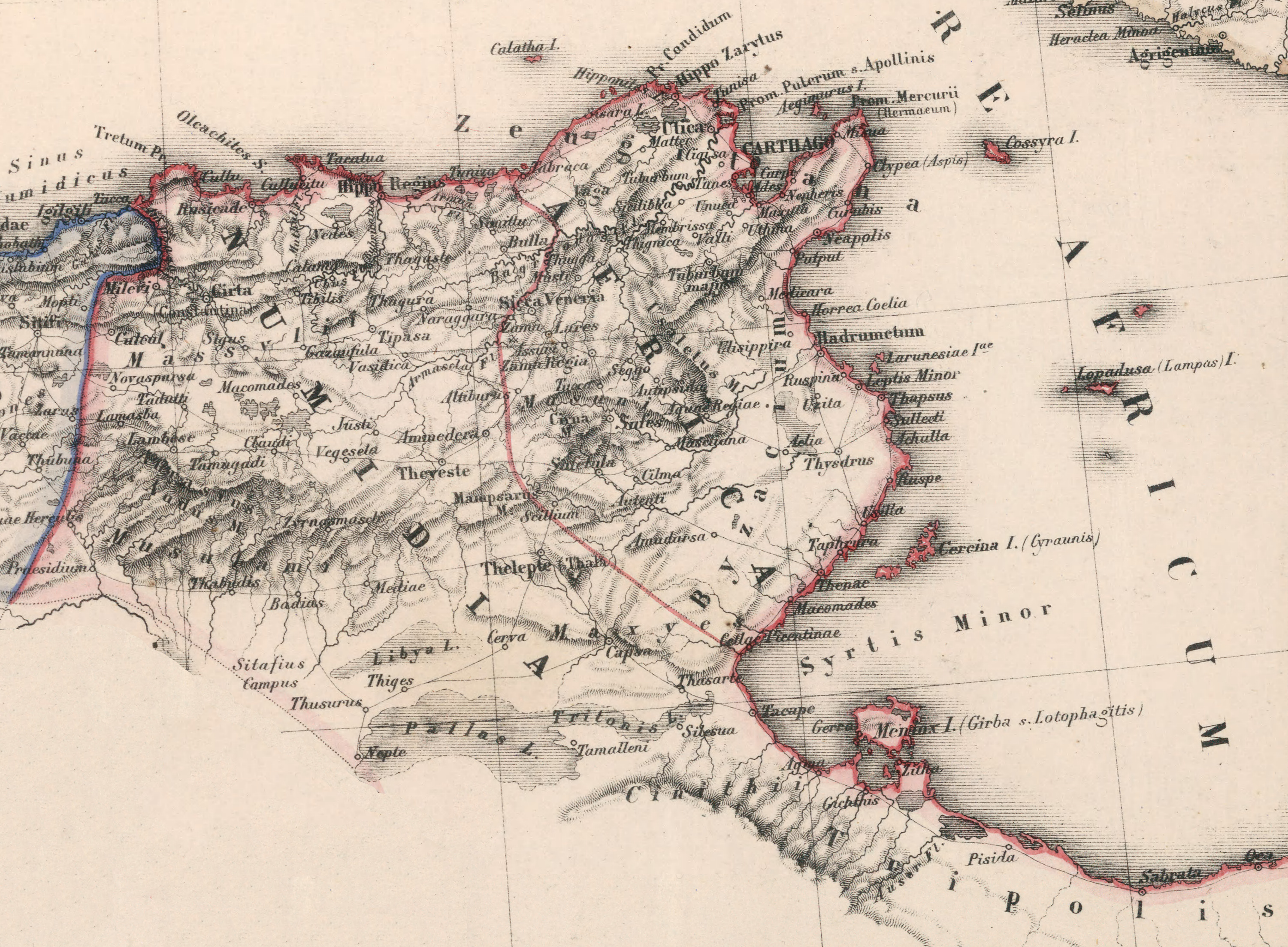
Roman Africa, with the provinces of Byzacena, Zeugitana and Numidia.

The Battle of Bourgaon took place in the summer of 535 at Mount Bourgaon in central Tunisia between the Byzantine Empire and numerically superior Berber rebels. Entrenched on the mountain, the rebels held the high ground until Byzantine troops scaled the opposite slope undetected at night. Launching a dawn assault from both sides, the Byzantines routed the insurgent force, reportedly killing or wounding nearly all of its fighters. The surviving leaders fled into the Berber Kingdom of Arris, bringing an end to the first stage of the Berber uprising.

== Prelude ==
The Battle of Bourgaon took place in the aftermath of the Vandalic War (533–534), which was fought in North Africa between the Byzantine Empire and the Vandal Kingdom as part of Emperor Justinian I's efforts to reclaim former Western Roman territories. Justinian sent an army led by Belisarius, who landed in September 533 and defeated the Vandals at the Battle of Ad Decimum, soon capturing Carthage. The Vandals were decisively defeated again at the Battle of Tricamarum in December. The Vandal king Gelimer surrendered in 534, ending the Vandal kingdom.

Byzantine General Belisarius, after his victory in the Vandalic War in Africa, had to return to Constantinople to deal with rumours against him in the royal court of Justinian I. Belisarius anticipated that the Berbers, who had remained quiet largely out of fear of him, would revolt upon his departure. He placed most of his bucellarii under Solomon's command and instructed him to put down the rebellion. The Berbers rebelled upon hearing of Belisarius' departure.

The Berbers invaded Byzacena and defeated the local Byzantine garrison, ambushing and killing its commanders, Aigan and Rufinus the Thracian, which damaged the morale of the Byzantine troops. After diplomatic entreaties over the winter failed, and with his forces bolstered to some 18,000 men following the arrival of reinforcements, in spring 535 Solomon led his troops into Byzacena. In early 535, Solomon defeated the Berber rebels, under their chiefs Cutzinas, Esdilasas, Iourphouthes, and Mesidinissas, in the Battle of Mammes. The Berbers retreated and regrouped at Mount Bourgaon, while the Byzantines sought to put an end to the revolt.

== Battle ==
The Berbers encamped on the mountain, which gave them a defensive advantage over the Byzantines. The Berbers, not expecting the Byzantines to attempt an outflanking manoeuvre from the east, which had a steep slope, concentrated all their forces on the west, where there was a gentle slope. Two eastern peaks, separated by a steep, narrow valley, overlooked the Berbers' camp on the western slope. Believing the peaks inaccessible, the Berbers left them undefended. Solomon's army camped in the valley, expecting the Berbers to descend and engage him in the open, but the Berbers refused to be drawn out.

Solomon did not wish to besiege the Berbers on the mountain due to its remote location and instead sought to engage the Berbers at the mountain. At first, the Byzantine troops' morale fell when confronted by their numerically superior opponent. After a speech by Solomon, the troops regained their morale and prepared for the fight. Solomon sent his commander, Theodorus, with about 1,000 excubitors to climb the eastern side of the mountain. Solomon gave Theodorus's troops additional military standards to give the impression that they were more numerous to the Berbers and to his own forces. He also did not tell his own troops about this attack to avoid being betrayed. The excubitors climbed up the mountain during the night without being noticed. Their task was to occupy one of the peaks behind the Berbers and be able to fire their bows.

At dawn, Solomon advanced his forces to the mountain's outskirts, while Theodorus's troops emerged on the opposite side, encircling the Berbers. Both detachments struck the Berbers with volleys of arrows, causing them to panic and try to flee, but they had no route of escape. Some of the Berbers fled to the other peak, while others escaped into the valley between them. In the valley, they trampled one another, causing many to fall to their deaths by the arrows. Once the valley was filled with the bodies of men and horses, the survivors were able to escape by crossing over the corpses. Nearly all of the Berber warriors were caught, killed, or wounded. All of the Berber chieftains were able to flee except for Esdilasas, who was caught and taken prisoner. According to contemporary historian Procopius, the Berbers suffered 50,000 casualties, while the Byzantines suffered none.

== Aftermath ==
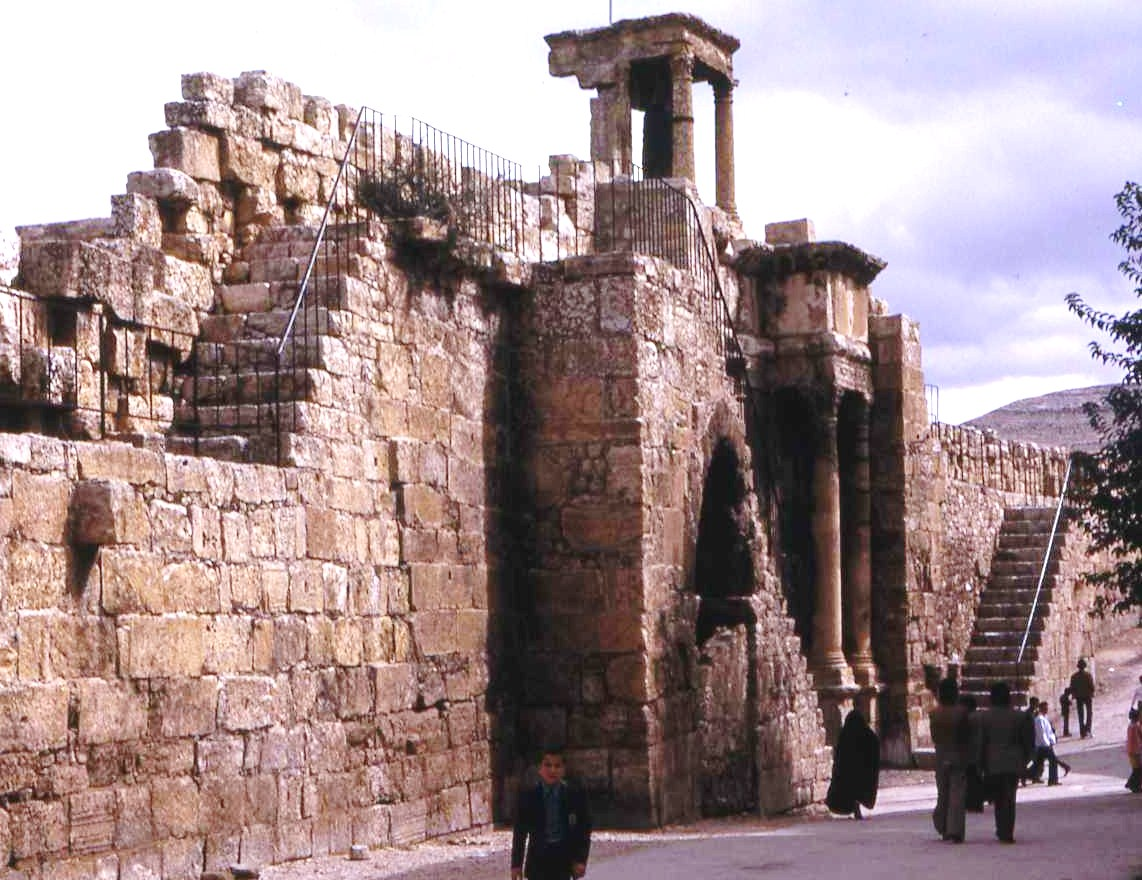
Ruins of the Byzantine walls of Theveste, one of the many sites restored and fortified under Solomon.

Solomon returned to Carthage, where Procopius suggests that the large number of captured slaves led to a significant decline in their prices; a captured boy was valued at the same price as a sheep. Procopius also mentions that the Berbers recalled a saying attributed to their women, which warned that a beardless man would destroy their people; a reference to Solomon, who was a eunuch. The surviving Berber soldiers retreated into Numidia, where they joined forces with Iabdas, King of the Aurès. Masuna, King of the Mauro-Roman Kingdom and allied with the Byzantines, and another Berber king, Ortaias (who ruled a kingdom in the former province of Mauretania Sitifensis), urged Solomon to pursue the enemy Berbers into Numidia, which he did. Solomon did not engage Iabdas in battle, mistrusting the loyalty of his allies, and instead constructed a series of fortified posts along the roads linking Byzacena with Numidia. In 536, Emperor Justinian considered that peace had been established in the region. However, a mutiny by Byzantine soldiers at Easter 536 and the subsequent Siege of Carthage, threatened control of the region.

== Sources ==
=== Primary ===
- Caesarea, Procopius (545–553). History of the Wars – via Wikisource.
- Prokopios (2014). The Wars of Justinian. Translated by Dewing, H. B. Hackett Publishing. ISBN 978-1-62466-172-3.
- Procopius (2007). History of the Wars: Books 3-4 (Vandalic War). Translated by Dewing, H. B. Cosimo, Inc. ISBN 978-1-60206-446-1.

=== Secondary ===
- Bury, John Bagnell (1958). History of the Later Roman Empire: From the Death of Theodosius I to the Death of Justinian. Vol. 2. Mineola, New York: Dover Publications, Inc.
- Graham, Alexander (2002) [1902]. Roman Africa. North Stratford, New Hampshire: Ayer Publishing, Incorporated. ISBN 0-8369-8807-8.
- Grierson, Philip (1959). "Matasuntha or Mastinas: a reattribution". The Numismatic Chronicle and Journal of the Royal Numismatic Society. 19: 119–130. JSTOR 42662366.
- Hughes, Ian (2009). Belisarius: The Last Roman General. Yardley, PA: Westholme Publishing. ISBN 978-1-59-416085-1. OCLC 294885267.
- Merrills, Andrew; Miles, Richard (2009). The Vandals. Wiley. ISBN 978-1-444-31808-1.
- MacDowall, Simon (2016). The Vandals. Pen and Sword. ISBN 978-1-4738-8022-1.
- Martindale, John R. (1992). The Prosopography of the Later Roman Empire 2 Part Set: Volume 3, AD 527-641. Cambridge University Press. ISBN 978-0-521-20160-5.
- Pringle, Denys (2001). The defence of Byzantine Africa from Justinian to the Arab conquest. British Archaeological Reports Publishing. doi:10.1017/CBO9781139048101. ISBN 9781407353548.
- Syvänne, Ilkka (2021). Military History of Late Rome 518–565. Yorkshire, PA: Pen and Sword Military. ISBN 978-1-4738-9530-0.
