= Kahina =

Al-Kahina
- Queen of the Aurès
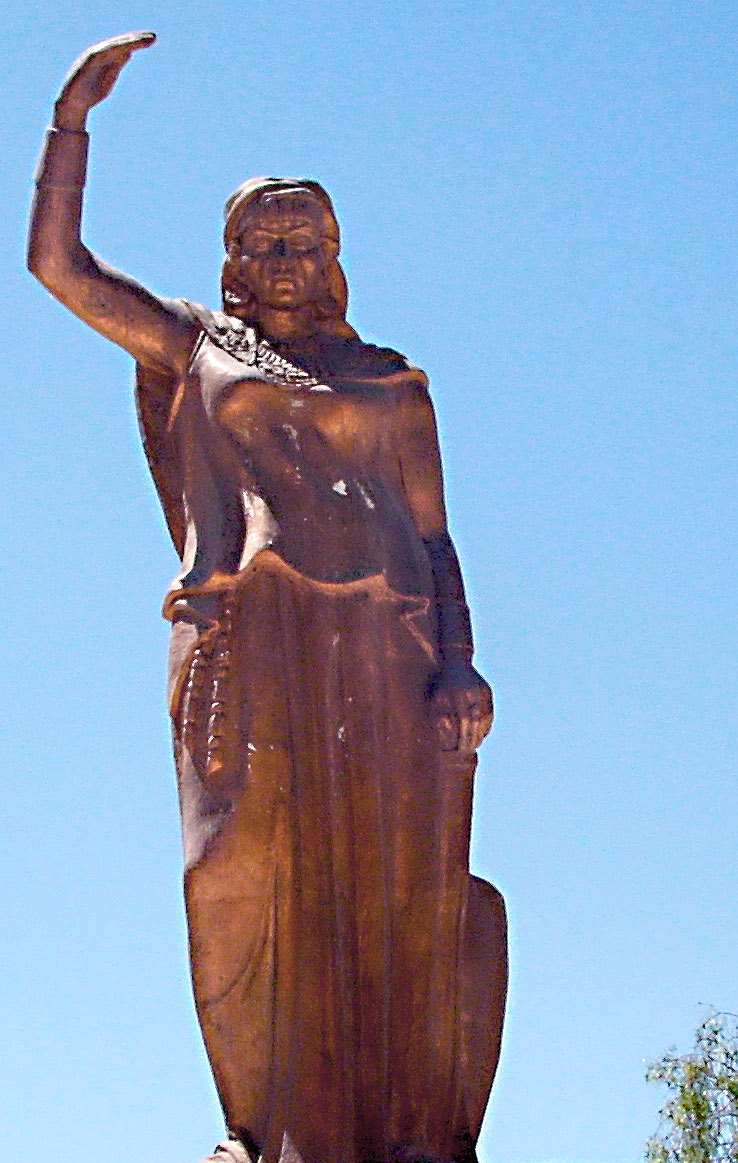
- Dihya memorial in Khenchela, Algeria

Queen of the Aurès
- Reign: c. 668 - 703
- Predecessor: Iaudas
- Born: Early seventh century 576 AD (Note: If Ibn Khaldun's claim that she was killed at the age of 127 years old can be believed, then this would be her birth year.)
- Died: September or October 703; Bir al-Kahina, Aurès
- Issue: Qwaider; Yamin; Khalid ibn Yazid al-Qaisi (adopted)
- Father: Tabat

Al-Kahina (Arabic: الكاهنة, romanized: al-Kāhina, lit. 'the priestess'), also known as Dihya (Berber languages: ⴷⵉⵀⵢⴰ), was an Amazigh warrior-queen of the Aurès (present-day Algeria) and a religious and military leader who lived during the 7th century.

Al-Kahina is known to have united various Amazigh tribes under her leadership to fight against the Muslim conquest of the Maghreb, leading the indigenous North African defense of the region then known as Numidia. She fought in multiple battles, notably defeating Umayyad forces in the Battle of Meskiana. Afterwards, she became the uncontested ruler of the whole Maghreb region, and remained so until being decisively defeated at the Battle of El Jem.

There are various accounts of the circumstances surrounding her death, but she is thought to have died in modern-day Algeria towards the end of the 7th century, or early-8th century. For five years Al-Kahina ruled a sovereign Berber state from the Aurès Mountains to the oasis of Ghadames (698–703). She is considered one of the most famous figures in the history of the Berber resistance to the Arab conquest. Her legacy has been retold through oral tradition since her lifetime. There are various written accounts of her from precolonial and postcolonial perspectives.

== Name ==
Her name was "Dihya" or "Dahya". Her title was cited by Arabic-language sources as al-Kāhina (the priestess soothsayer) (Arabic: الكاهنة). This was the nickname given to by her Muslim opponents because of her alleged ability to foresee the future.

== Origins and religion ==
Over three centuries after her death, Tunisian hagiographer al-Mālikī seems to have been among the first to state she resided in the Aurès Mountains. There is some debate about which Berber tribe Al-Kahina originated from. Seven centuries after her death, the pilgrim at-Tijani was told she belonged to the Lūwāta tribe. However, when the later historian Ibn Khaldun wrote his account, he placed her with the Jarawa tribe.

Various authors have claimed that Al-Kahina was Jewish, interpreting the name as Cohen or Kohane. Various sources suggest that she was of Jewish faith or that her tribe were Judaized Berbers. The idea that the Jarawa were Judaized comes from the medieval historian Ibn Khaldun. Hirschberg and Talbi note that Ibn Khaldun seems to have been referring to a time before the advent of the late Roman and Byzantine empires, and a little later in the same paragraph seems to say that by Roman times "the tribes" had become Christianized. As early as 1963, the Israeli historian H.Z. Hirschberg, while retranslating the text of Ibn Khaldun, questioned this interpretation, and in general the existence of large Jewish Berber tribes in the end of Antiquity. In the words of Hirschberg, "of all the known movements of conversion to Judaism and incidents of Judaizing, those connected with the Berbers and Sudanese in Africa are the least authenticated."

According to al-Mālikī, Al-Kahina was accompanied in her travels by an "idol". Both Mohamed Talbi and Gabriel Camps interpreted this idol as a Christian icon, either of Christ, the Virgin, or a saint protecting the queen. However, Tunisian historian M'hamed Hassine Fantar held that this icon represented a separate Berber deity, suggesting she followed traditional Berber religion. However, Al-Kahina being a Christian remains the most likely hypothesis. According to various Muslim sources, al-Kāhina was the daughter of Tabat, or Yanfaq, though according to Ibn Khaldun she was the daughter Mātiya ibn Tifan.

== Military victory in Meskiana ==
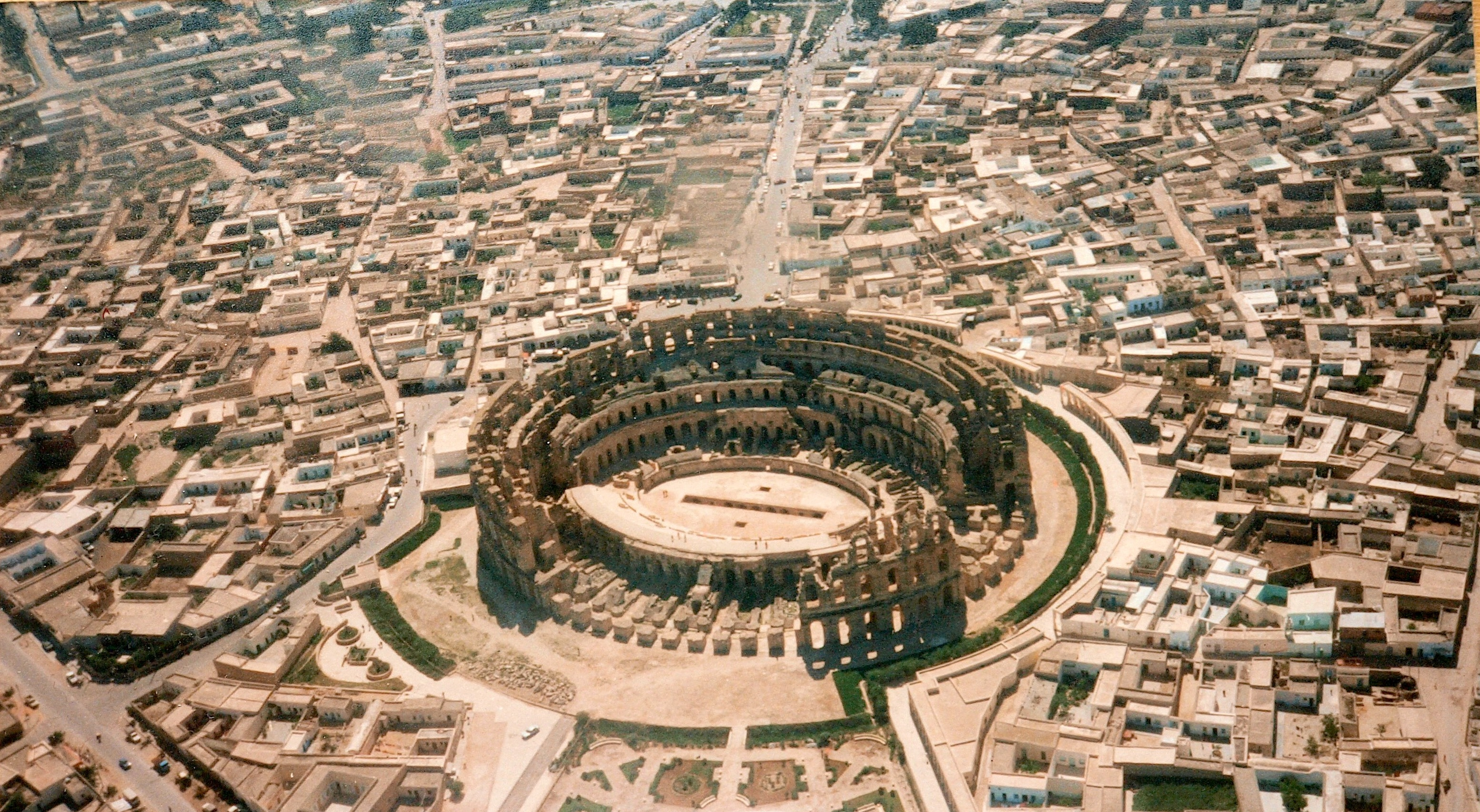
El Djem Amphitheater aerial view. The amphitheater was converted into a fortress, and in 699 CE served as a refuge for El Kahina during her fight against the Arab invaders. After the battle, the town was abandoned, and the site was reoccupied only during the French colonial period.

In the 680s, after Kusaila was killed and the Kingdom of Altava declined, most of the Berbers joined Dihya and the Kingdom of the Aurès.

After a successful siege of Carthage, the Arab Muslim general Hassan ibn al-Nu'man searched for his next enemy to confront. The people of Kairouan told him that the most powerful ruler in North Africa was al-Kahina. They described her as "a woman in the Aurès Mountains, feared by the Romans and followed by the Berbers", and he accordingly marched into the Aurès Mountains.

In 698, after hearing of Hassan’s arrival, al-Kahina demolished the city of Baghaya, believing that Hassan intended to use it as a fortified base. When Hassan heard of this, he advanced into the Aurès, and Kahina moved to meet him. the armies met in the Meskiana Valley in the present-day province of Oum el-Bouaghi in Algeria, at the Battle of Meskiana. Al-Kahina defeated Hassan decisively, and after pursuing him as far as Gabes, he fled Ifriqiya and remained in Cyrenaica for five years.

== Reign ==
After the battle, she spared all the Muslim captives and sent them to Hassan in Cyrenaica, except for Khalid ibn Yazid al-Qaysi. She took him back with her to her home in the Aurès and said to him, "I have never seen a man more handsome or braver than you. I want to nurse you so that you will be a brother to my sons." She had two sons, one said to be of Greek origin and the other Berber. According to al-Raqiq al-Kairouani, one was named "Qwaider" and the other "Yamin". Khalid answered, “How can that be when you have lost the ability to nurse?” She replied, “We Berbers have a custom of nursing that allows us to inherit from one another.” She then took barley flour and mixed it with oil, making what is known in the Maghreb as bsisa, and placed it on her breasts. She called her two sons and said to them, “Eat it with him from my breasts.” After they finished, she told them, “You are now brothers.” In this way, she adopted Khalid ibn Yazid.

Realizing that the enemy was too powerful and bound to return, and believing that Muslims came for gold and silver and the riches of the cities, Kahina was said to have embarked on a scorched earth campaign, which had little impact on the mountain and desert tribes, but lost her the crucial support of the sedentary oasis-dwellers. Instead of discouraging the Muslim armies, her desperate decision hastened defeat, as the Roman and Berber population went to Barqa telling Hassan and asking for his help.

== Defeat and demise ==
Hasan ibn al-Nu'man eventually returned, aided by communications with the captured officer Khalid ibn Yazid al-Qaysi, who had been adopted by al-Kahina. When she heard of his arrival, Kahina gathered many Berber tribes to resist the new invasion. She fortified herself in the Amphitheatre of El Jem. That night, however, she saw a vision in which she was killed and her head was placed before the "Great King of the Arabs".

Kahina gathered her children and told them of the vision. Khalid said to her, "If this is so, then leave with us and surrender the land to him [Hassan]." Her children said similar things. She replied, "How can I leave and flee when I am a queen? Monarchs do not flee from death, and how can I bring shame upon my people for all eternity", Ibn Yazid and her children said to her, "What will we do after your death?" She answered, "As for you, Ibn Yazid, you will attain a great rank with the Great King of the Arabs [Abd al-Malik ibn Marwan]. As for my children, they will gain power with the man who will kill me [Hassan], and they will establish glory for the Berbers." She then ordered Khalid to take her sons and go to the Muslim camp, telling him, "I adopted you for this day." Khalid obeyed.

Then the battle began. Kahina left the amphitheatre with her hair loose and fought alongside her people at the Battle of El Jem in Ramadan (September or October) 703. She was defeated and fled the battlefield. Hassan pursued her until he caught and killed her near a well that still bears her name, Bir al-Kahina, in the Aurès Mountains. Other sources claim that the battle took place in Tabarka, where al-Kahina was killed. According to Ibn Khldun, she was killed at the age of 127, which is hard to believe.

Regardless of the exact circumstances of her death, it is reported that she was beheaded and that her head was sent to the Umayyad Caliph Abd al-Malik ibn Marwan in Damascus as proof of her death, exactly as she is said to have predicted.

== Legacy ==
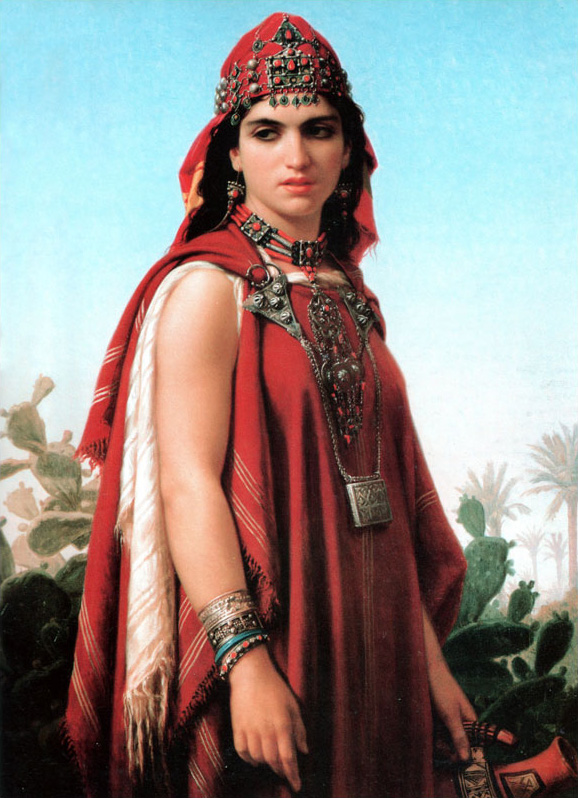
This 19th century painting by Émile Vernet-Lecomte intitulated "Berber Woman" is often misinterpreted as a portrait of Dihya

Although Al-Kahina's writings (including poems and speeches) were all destroyed after her death, she was adopted as a symbol by North African women in resistance to foreign occupation and against male hegemony. During the period of French colonisation of Algeria, Kahina was a model for the militant women who fought as part of the resistance. In the Kabyle insurrection of 1851 and 1857, women such as Algerian national hero Lalla Fatma N'Soumer and Lalla Khadija Bent Belkacem, who were known as chief warriors, took Al-Kahina as a model.

In the early 20th century, the French, anxious to Frenchify Algeria by Romanising its past, drew parallels between themselves and the Romans. The Algerian nationalists, seeking to tie Algeria to the East instead, draw the same parallels, but for them both Rome and France were colonial powers, responsible for the decline of Phoenician civilisation in the past, and Arabic civilization in the present. Both ideologies used Kahina's mythology as a founding myth. On one side, she was the one who fought the Arabs and Islam to keep Algeria Christian. On the other, she was the one who fought all invaders (Byzantines or Arabs) to create an independent state.

In the present day, the image of Kahina is constantly used by Berber activists to showcase how they, as a people, are strong and will not be conquered or diminished by other communities. Her face is often seen in graffiti and sculptures around Algeria to showcase their support for the progressive ideals she represents. While her true appearance is still unknown, artists have depicted her with certain aspects that reinforce the progressive movement she is known to represent.

However, not all governments accept the ideals behind Kahina. One statue of Kahina in Baghai was condemned by the government due to blasphemy. The president of the Defense of the Arab Language, Othman Saadi, said that Kahina represented the resistance to Islam, and thus, should be condemned.

== See also ==
- Umayyad conquest of North Africa
- Kingdom of the Aurès
- Kusaila

== Bibliography ==
- Ibn Khaldun, Kitāb al-Ibar. Usually cited as: Histoire des Berbères et des dynasties musulmanes de l'Afrique septentrionale, a French trans. by William McGuckin de Slane, Paul Geuthner, Paris, 1978. This 19th-century translation should now be regarded as obsolete. There is a more accurate modern French translation by Abdesselam Cheddadi, Peuples et Nations du Monde: extraits des Ibar, Sindbad, Paris, 1986 & 1995. Hirschberg (1963) gives an English translation of the section where Ibn Khaldun discusses the supposed Judaized Jarāwa.
- Hannoum, Abdelmajid. (2001). Post-Colonial Memories: The Legend of the Dihyā, a North African Heroine (Studies in African Literature). ISBN 0-325-00253-3. This is a study of the legend of the Dihyā in the 19th century and later. The first chapter is a detailed critique of how the legend of the Dihyā emerged after several transformations from the 9th century to the 14th.
- Hirschberg, H.Z. (November 1963). "The Problem of the Judaized Berbers". The Journal of African History. 4 (3): 313–339. doi:10.1017/S0021853700004278. ISSN 1469-5138. S2CID 162261998.
- Hirschberg, H.Z. (1974). A History of the Jews in North Africa. Vol. 1 From Antiquity to the Sixteenth Century (2nd ed., Eng. trans. ed.). Brill. ISBN 978-90-04-03820-2.
- al-Mālikī, Riyād an-Nufūs. Partial French trans. (including the story of the Dihyā) by H.R. Idris, 'Le récit d'al-Mālikī sur la Conquête de l'Ifrīqiya', Revue des Etudes Islamiques 37 (1969) 117–149. The accuracy of this translation has been criticised by Talbi (1971) and others.
- Modéran, Yves (2005). "Kahena. (Al-Kâhina)". Kahena. Encyclopédie berbère. Vol. 27 | Kairouan – Kifan Bel-Ghomari. Aix-en-Provence: Edisud. pp. 4102–4111. doi:10.4000/encyclopedieberbere.1306. ISBN 978-2-7449-0538-4. The most recent critical study of the historical sources.
- Talbi, Mohammed. (1971). Un nouveau fragment de l'histoire de l'Occident musulman (62–196/682–812) : l'épopée d'al Kahina. (Cahiers de Tunisie vol. 19 pp. 19–52). An important historiographical study.
- at-Tijānī, Rihlat. Arabic text ed. by H.H. Abdulwahhab, Johann Wolfgang Goethe University, Frankfurt, 1994. French trans. by A. Rousseau in Journal Asiatique, section containing the story of the Dihyā is in n.s. 4, vol. 20 (1852) 57–208.
