= Kingdom of Hodna =

Historical Romano-Berber kingdom

- Map of the Romano-Berber Kingdoms, according to the French historian Christian Courtois.
- Status: Rump state of the Mauro-Roman Kingdom
- Common languages: Berber, African Romance Latin
- Government: Monarchy
- King
  - c. 6th century: Ortaias
- Historical era: Medieval
Preceded by	Succeeded by
Mauro-Roman Kingdom	Umayyad Caliphate
- Today part of: Algeria

The Kingdom of Hodna is the name of a Romano-Berber kingdom located mostly in Mauretania Sitifensis outside the Hodna Mountains in what is present-day Algeria. In the 6th century AD, the polity was led by a king named Ortaias. Initially an ally of the Byzantine Empire, Ortaias was opposed by Mastigas of the Mauro-Roman Kingdom and Iaudas of the Kingdom of the Aurès. It is likely that the Kingdom of Hodna was conquered or absorbed by the Byzantine Empire around 539 after the Praetorian prefect of Africa, Solomon returned land that included the kingdom's territory "into Roman power".
