= Althias =

Hun military commander

Althias (Greek: Ἀλϑίας; fl. 530) was a Hun military commander in the Byzantine Empire. He is noted for defeating Iaudas, king of the Moors, and his army with just 70 men.

== Biography ==
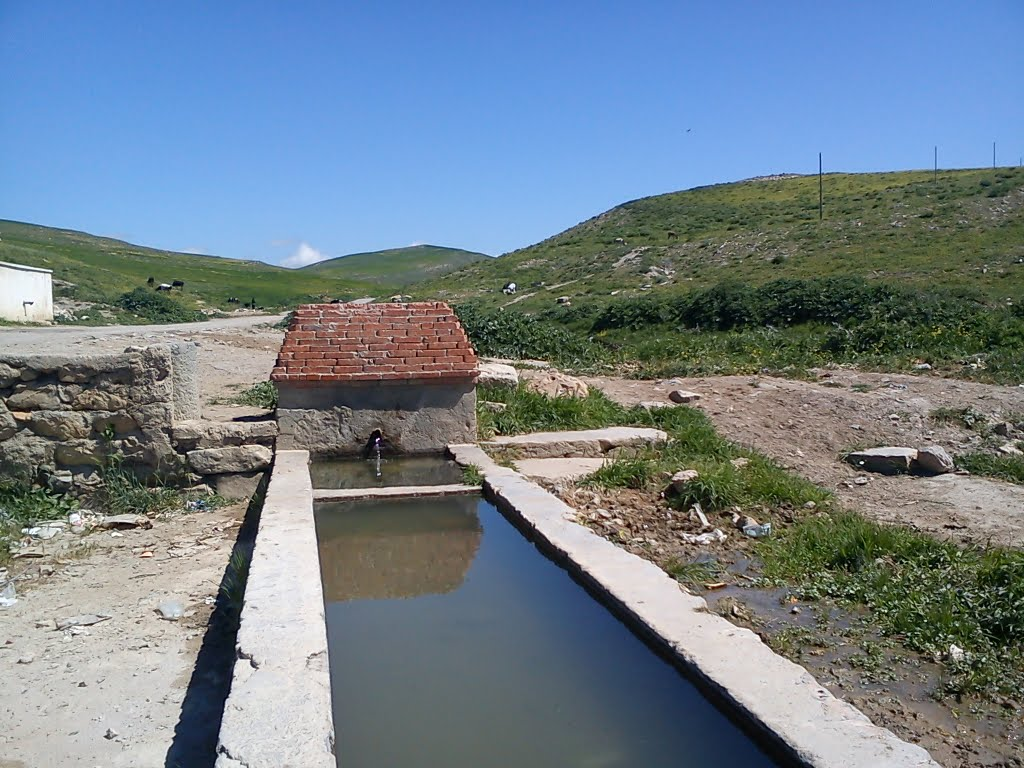
Althias and Iaudas fought near the spring of Tigisis, present-day Aïn el-Bordj, Algeria

He commanded the Hun auxiliaries of the Byzantine Empire in about 530 AD.

He fought for the Romans in the Moorish wars. Here, he accomplished the feat of defeating Iaudas, King of the Moors, and his troops with just 70 cavalrymen. He led his seventy men to capture a spring located near to where Iaudas and his troop were attacking. The Moors reached the spring thirsty and Althias, who wanted to recover some prisoners, refused half of their booty in exchange of allowing them to the spring, proposing that he and the king of the Moors fight in single combat. The Moors rejoiced, as Althias was skinny and not tall, whereas Iaudas was their finest man. They fought mounted. Iaudas threw his spear at him but Althias, to the Moors' surprise, caught it with his right hand. Althias, who was ambidextrous, then drew his bow with the other hand, instantly shot and killed Iaudas' horse. The Moors brought their king another horse, he leapt on it and galloped away. The whole army fled with him, and the Huns recovered both the captives and the whole booty.

Procopius related that because of this deed, he achieved fame throughout Africa.

== Etymology ==
His name is of Turkic origin. Rásonyi compared it to the Kazakh patronymic Altyev and listed many clan names and personal names containing altï as their first element (e.g. Altybai, Altyortak, Altyate).
