= Mephanias =

King of the Mauro-Roman Kingdom (debated)
- Reign: c. ?–508?
- Predecessor: Unknown
- Successor: Masuna (?)
- Died: c. 508? Mauretania Caesariensis
- Issue: Massônas (might be Masuna); A daughter married to Iaudas
- Greek: Μεφανίας
- Religion: Christianity

Mephanias (in Ancient Greek: Μεφανίας) was a Moorish leader of the early 6th century, known only from the account of the Byzantine historian Procopius. He is primarily known as the father of Massonas and the father-in-law of King Iaudas.

Informations about him are extremely limited, and no epigraphic or archaeological evidence clarifies his territory or exact status.

== Biography ==
Mephenias is mentioned in Procopius's "De Bello Vandalico", written in the mid-6th century. According to Procopius, he was the father of Massonas, a Moorish leader allied with the Byzantine Empire during General Solomon's campaigns against the rebellious tribes of Byzantine Africa. His daughter married Iaudas, the king of the Aurès, this can be said as he's referred to as Massonas' brother-in-law. Relations between the two men deteriorated, however, and Iaudas eventually had his father-in-law assassinated. Following this murder, Massonas joined the Byzantines to fight Iaudas.

Procopius does not specify the exact circumstances of Mephenias's power, nor the territory he governed. He does not explicitly attribute to him the title of king (rex or βασιλεύς) and simply presents him as a Moorish leader.

== A predecessor of Masuna? ==
Mephanias has been proposed as a possible predecessor of Masuna, the ruler attested in a Latin inscription from Altava dated to 508. However, this hypothesis depends partly on identifying Massonas with Masuna, an identification that has been questioned by modern scholarship.

Michel Janon's study of Procopius's account of the Aurès also emphasizes the need for caution when reconstructing the political structures of the region from the limited surviving narrative evidence.

Jérôme Carcopino and Christian Courtois have admitted the potential existence of a patrilineal dynasty involving Mephanias and Massonas. However, Michel Janon noted that the available evidence does not establish that Mephanias was a king or that Massonas even succeeded him.

== Sources ==
=== Bibliography ===
- Procopius, De Bello Vandalico, II, 13–20 (édition H. B. Dewing, Loeb Classical Library, Harvard University Press, 1916-1940).
- Gabriel Camps, « Masuna », Encyclopédie berbère, vol. 30, Peeters, 2010.
- Yves Modéran, Les Maures et l'Afrique romaine (IVe-VIIe siècle), École française de Rome, 2003.
- Modéran, Yves (2013-05-22). Les Maures et l'Afrique romaine (in French). Publications de l’École française de Rome. ISBN 978-2-7283-1003-6.
- Stéphane Gsell, Histoire ancienne de l'Afrique du Nord, t. VI, Paris, Hachette, 1928.
- Christian Courtois, Les Vandales et l'Afrique, Paris, Arts et Métiers Graphiques, 1955.
- Martindale, John Robert; Jones, A. H. M.; Morris, John (1992). The Prosopography of the Later Roman Empire - Volume III, AD 527–641. Cambridge (GB): Cambridge University Press. ISBN 0-521-20160-8.
