= Mastigas =

- King of Altava
- Siliqua minted in Justinian's name with the supposed monogram of Mastigas

King of the Mauro-Roman Kingdom
- Reign: 535–541
- Predecessor: Masuna
- Successor: Stotzas
- Died: 541 or after
- Issue: A daughter, married to Stotzas
- Greek: Μαστίγας or Μαστίνας
- Religion: Christianity

Mastigas or Mastinas (Greek: Μαστίγας or Μαστίνας, fl. 535–541) ruled the Mauro-Roman Kingdom during the sixth century as King of the Moors and Romans, succeeding Masuna. During the reign of Mastigas, the Mauro-Roman Kingdom governed almost the entire ancient Roman province of Mauretania Caesariensis, except for the former capital of Caesarea which was held by the Eastern Roman Empire.

Mastigas would ally with Iaudas, ruler of the Kingdom of the Aurès and an enemy of both the Eastern Roman Empire and the previous Mauro-Roman king, Masuna, in an attempt at capturing territory from other smaller Berber kingdoms in the region. Unlike Iaudas and his kingdom, the realm of Mastigas would not face any Eastern Roman attacks, possibly due to its more distant location, and would later on provide a safe haven for surviving defeated Berber forces and rebel Romans.

However, Pierre Morizot identifies Mastigas with Masties, the Emperor of the Aurès. An identification which, if proven correct, would call into question the possible dates for Masties’ reign in the Aurès, given that Mastigas was active during the 530s–540s a period by which Masties would have already been dead for more than 20 years.

== Reign ==
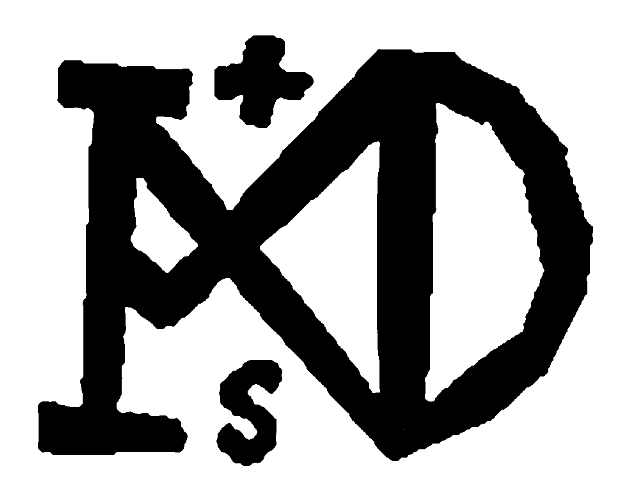
Monogram of Mastigas, as seen on his coins.

Mastigas ruled the Berbers of Mauretania Caesariensis in the late 530s, succeeding Masuna. The Eastern Roman historian Procopius is the only source on him, briefly mentioning Mastigas and other local Berber rulers in Book II of the De Bello Vandalico. Mastigas was identified as an independent ruler with control of much of the former Roman province except for the former capital, Caesarea, which had been in Vandal possession and later reconquered by the Eastern Roman Empire under the famous general Belisarius in 533 AD.

Southern Numidia, known as the Kingdom of the Aurès, was ruled by King Iaudas, an enemy of the Eastern Roman Empire and of the previous Mauro-Roman King Masuna, and large parts of the former province of Mauretania Sitifensis was under the rule of King Ortaias, who had been an ally of Masuna. Mastigas allied with Iaudas in an attempt at capturing territory held by Ortaias. Iaudas would be defeated by the Eastern Roman Empire, but Mauretania would not see any Eastern Roman attacks, perhaps due to it being located further away from the African capital of Carthage. Perhaps due to its further off location, the Mauro-Roman Kingdom would act as a safe haven for surviving defeated Berber warriors and even rebel Romans, such as for the African rebel Stotzas and his followers. Stotzas married the daughter of a local noble (perhaps the daughter of Mastigas or Masuna) and was allegedly named as King in 541 AD, potentially succeeding Mastigas as King of the Moors and Romans.

Mastigas struck coins bearing his own monogram as well as the portrait of the Eastern Roman Emperor, at this time Justinian I, much like the rulers of other Barbarian kingdoms.

== Identification ==
While some historians have seemingly tried to discern Mastinas and Mastigas as two different individuals in Procopius’s account, these fragments of information actually shed a fleeting light on a single, powerful king according to Yves Modéran. Unfortunately, almost nothing is known about the origins of Mastigas’s kingdom, nor about the man himself. However, Moderan says that it is quite possible that he was the direct successor of Masuna.

Consequently, the kingdom of Mastigas should not be viewed as a territory cut off from the world, mired in barbarism and chaos. Like Masuna, he united Moors and Romans within an original and independent political structure a true state in which he levied taxes (as Procopius mentions the collection of tribute) and likely minted coinage. It is perhaps only the scarcity of written sources and the insufficiency of archaeological research into the late-occupation strata at sites within the interior of Mauretania Caesariensis that prevent us from recognizing him as one of the major figures in the Berber history of antiquity.

== Meloussa stele ==
The lybico-roman inscription of Meloussa which might be in the name of Mastigas

The Meloussa stele is an ancient Libyco-Berber inscription discovered in 1968 at Meloussa, near Sidi Aïch. The inscription was discovered by Hadj Abderrahmane Sayfi and is composed of three vertical lines written in the ancient Libyan script. It is preserved at the municipal library of Sidi Aïch.

The inscription has been transliterated as MLS / GLMSTN / YSBT₂WN. Its interpretation remains uncertain, although scholars have identified possible personal names within the text. Of particular interest is the sequence MSTN, which has been compared with the names of some ancient North African figures. Among them, Mastigas has been proposed as being the person possibly named, an other theory also emits the possibility that it mentions instead Imastan, a Libyan warrior mentioned by the late antique poet Corippus. The issue is that the stele hasn't been dated yet so any identification to a certain ruler remains purely theorical.

Regnal titles
Preceded by Masuna	King of the Moors and Romans; 535–541	Succeeded by Stotzas
