= Jarawa (Berber tribe) =

Berber tribal confederacy

The Jarawa or Jrāwa were a nomadic Berber Zenata tribal confederacy, who may have converted to Christianity according to Mohamed Talbi, though Ibn Khaldun claimed they were Jewish. The Berber tribe ruled in northwest Africa before and during the 7th century. Under queen Dihya, the tribe led the Berber resistance against the Umayyad Islamic invasion in the late 7th century.
