= Tabat =

7th century Berber chieftain

- Chieftain of the Djerawa (?)
- Reign: 7th century AD
- Predecessor: Nīqān (?)
- Issue: Dihya
- Father: Nīqān/Tifian

Tabat (also rendered Tabita, Tabeta or Ṭabāt) also known as Mātiya was, according to the 14th-century historian Ibn Khaldun, the father of Dihya, a Berber leader who resisted the Umayyad conquest of the Maghreb during the late 7th century. He is traditionally associated with the Djerawa (Jarawa), a Berber tribe belonging to the Zenata confederation.

He is mentioned in the genealogical account of Dihya preserved by Ibn Khaldun in his Kitāb al-ʿIbar. He gives her ancestry as descending from Tabita, son of Nīqān, son of Bāwrā, through several generations to Jrāw, the eponymous ancestor associated with the Djerawa.

He specifically says:

"Dihya, daughter of Tabita (Tabat), son of Nīqān, son of Bāwrā, son of Mes-Kesri, son of Afrad, son of Wasīla, son of Jrāw"

Ibn Khaldun also records an alternative name for Dihya's father, Mātiya.A link between this name and the Christian names Matthias or Mathew have also been proposed, although this interpretation remains hypothetical. Tifian (an other form of Nīqān), Tabat's father's name has also been proposed as being a form of the name Theophanes.

While the genealogy connects Dihya's family to the Djerawa, a Berber group traditionally associated with the Aurès region of present-day Algeria. However, the reliability of this genealogical tradition is disputed, as Ibn Khaldun wrote all of this in the 14th century, several centuries after Dihya's supposed lifetime, and his genealogical account cannot be independently corroborated by contemporary evidence.
