= Masuna =

- King of Altava; King of the Roman and Moorish peoples
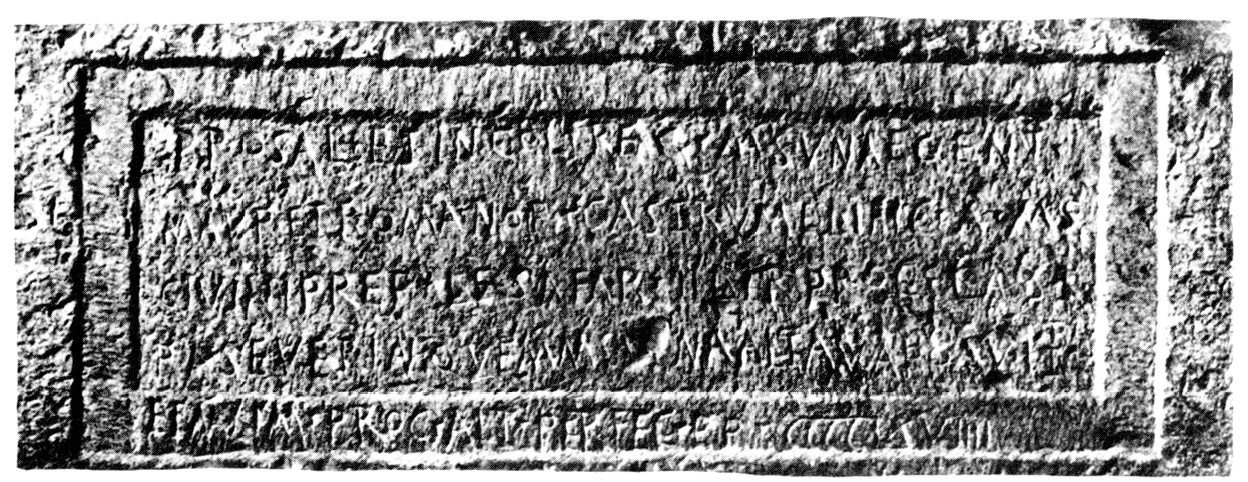
- The inscription of Atlava (dated c. 508) mentions him (Note: In full, the inscription reads: "Pro sal(ute) et incol(umitate) reg(is) Masunae gent(ium) Maur(orum) et Romanor(um) castrum edific(atum) a Masgivini pref(ecto) de Safar. Lidir proc(uratore) castra Severian(a) quem Masuna Altava posuit, et Maxim(us) pr(ocurator) Alt(ava) prefec(it). P(ositum) p(rovinciae) CCCLXVIIII". ("For the health and safety of king Masuna and of the Mauri and Roman peoples, the Castra was built by Masgiven, prefect of Safar, Lidir, procurator of Castra Severiana, whom Masuna installed at Altava and Maximus, procurator of Altava, appointed to command. This was installed in year 369 of the province") The three officials appointed are Masgiven (prefect of Safar), Lidir (procurator of Castra Severiana) and Maximus (procurator of Altava). The "year of the province," was counted from the date when the province was established, so the inscription dates to 508 AD.)

King of the Mauro-Roman Kingdom
- Reign: c. 508–535
- Predecessor: Mephanias (?)
- Successor: Mastigas
- Born: Mauretania Caesariensis (western Algeria)
- Died: Unknown, 535 or after
- Greek: Μασσωνας
- Father: Mephanias (?)
- Religion: Christianity

Masuna or Massonas or even Massônas (fl. c. 508–535) was a Berber ruler of the Mauro-Roman Kingdom, centered at Altava in present-day western Algeria, near the Tlemcen region. He is attested as a Christian and is known from an inscription identifying him as king over both Roman and Mauri populations. He was able to maintain the independence of his kingdom by resisting occupation from the Vandals. King Masuna allied with the Eastern Roman Emperor Justinian and assisted him in a war against the Vandals in 533 and also against other invading Berber tribal confederations. During his reign he was obeyed by the tribes of Mauretania.

== Reign ==
Masuna is the earliest recorded ruler of the Mauro-Roman Kingdom, a Berber kingdom that sprung up in the former province of Mauretania Caesariensis following the collapse of the Western Roman Empire. This kingdom, unlike many other successor kingdoms, extended beyond the borders of the former Roman Empire, encompassing Berber territories that had never been under Roman control. Masuna is known only from an inscription on a fortification in Altava (modern Ouled Mimoun, in the region of Oran), dated 508 AD, where he styles himself as the Rex gentium Maurorum et Romanorum, the "King of the Roman and Moorish peoples". He is known to have possessed Altava, assumed to have been the capital due to its prominence under subsequent kings, and at least two other cities, Castra Severiana and Safar, as mention is made of officials he appointed there. As the seat of an ecclesiarchal diocese (the diocese of Castra Severiana, an ancient bishophoric which flourished during Late Antiquity), the control of Castra Severiana may have been particularly important.

=== Relations with the Eastern Roman Empire ===
The Eastern Roman historian Procopius mentions a Berber king called "Massonas", often assumed to be the same person as Masuna, as having allied with the forces of the Eastern Roman Empire in the 530s against the Vandal Kingdom in the Vandalic War. Masuna is assumed to have been among the Berber rulers that willingly submitted to Belisarius and the Eastern Roman forces, demanding in return the symbols of their offices: a silver crown, a staff of silver gilt, a tunic and gilded boots.

After the Vandals were defeated and the Eastern Roman Empire restored Roman rule over Northern Africa, the local Byzantine governors would begin to experience problems with some of the local Berber tribes and kingdoms. The province of Byzacena was particularly affected, seeing repeated invasions and the destruction of the local garrison and death of its commanders. The Praetorian prefect of Africa, Solomon, waged several wars against these Berbers and defeated them twice. Surviving Berber soldiers retreated into Numidia, joining forces with Iaudas, King of the Aurès.

Masuna and another Berber king allied with the Eastern Empire, Ortaias (who ruled a kingdom in the former province of Mauretania Sitifensis), suggested that Solomon pursue the enemy Berbers into Numidia, which he did. Solomon did not engage Iaudas in battle however as he distrusted the loyalty of his allies, and instead constructed a series of fortified posts along the roads linking Byzacena with Numidia.

Mauro-roman mosaic sometimes thought to depict Masuna

=== Massonas ===
As it was said earlier, Masuna is often identified as Massonas a man mentionned by byzantine authors like Procopius. But some historians believe that Masuna and Massonas might be different people.

Massonas was the son and brother-in-law, respectively, of the chieftains Mephanias and Iaudas. Following the assassination of his father by Iaudas, he and another Berber chieftain, Ortaias, appealed to the Byzantine general Solomon, urging him to attack his rival in the Aurès, the latter's power base.

In 535, the Byzantine army, commanded by Solomon and guided by Massonas and Ortaias, began its campaign. Solomon distributed large sums of money to his Berber allies and advanced cautiously into the Aurès; on the seventh day, he confronted Iaudas. The two armies watched each other for three days before Iaudas disappeared. Running low on supplies and beginning to distrust the loyalty of the Berbers, Solomon chose to end the campaign and withdrew to the plains, where he constructed a fortified camp. Massônas disappears from the Byzantine chronicles after this campaign.

Massonas disappears from sources after this.

Regnal titles
Preceded by Unknown	King of the Moors and Romans c. 508–535	Succeeded by Mastigas
