= Battle of Mammes =

534 battle

- Part of Byzantine–Moorish wars
Location	Valley of Mamma, south of modern Aïn Djeloula
Result	Byzantine victory

Belligerents
Byzantine Empire	Berber tribes

Commanders and leaders
Solomon	Cutzinas; Esdilasas; Mesdinissas; Iourphoutes

Strength
18,000	Unknown, but higher than Byzantine numbers

Casualties and losses
Unknown	10,000 dead

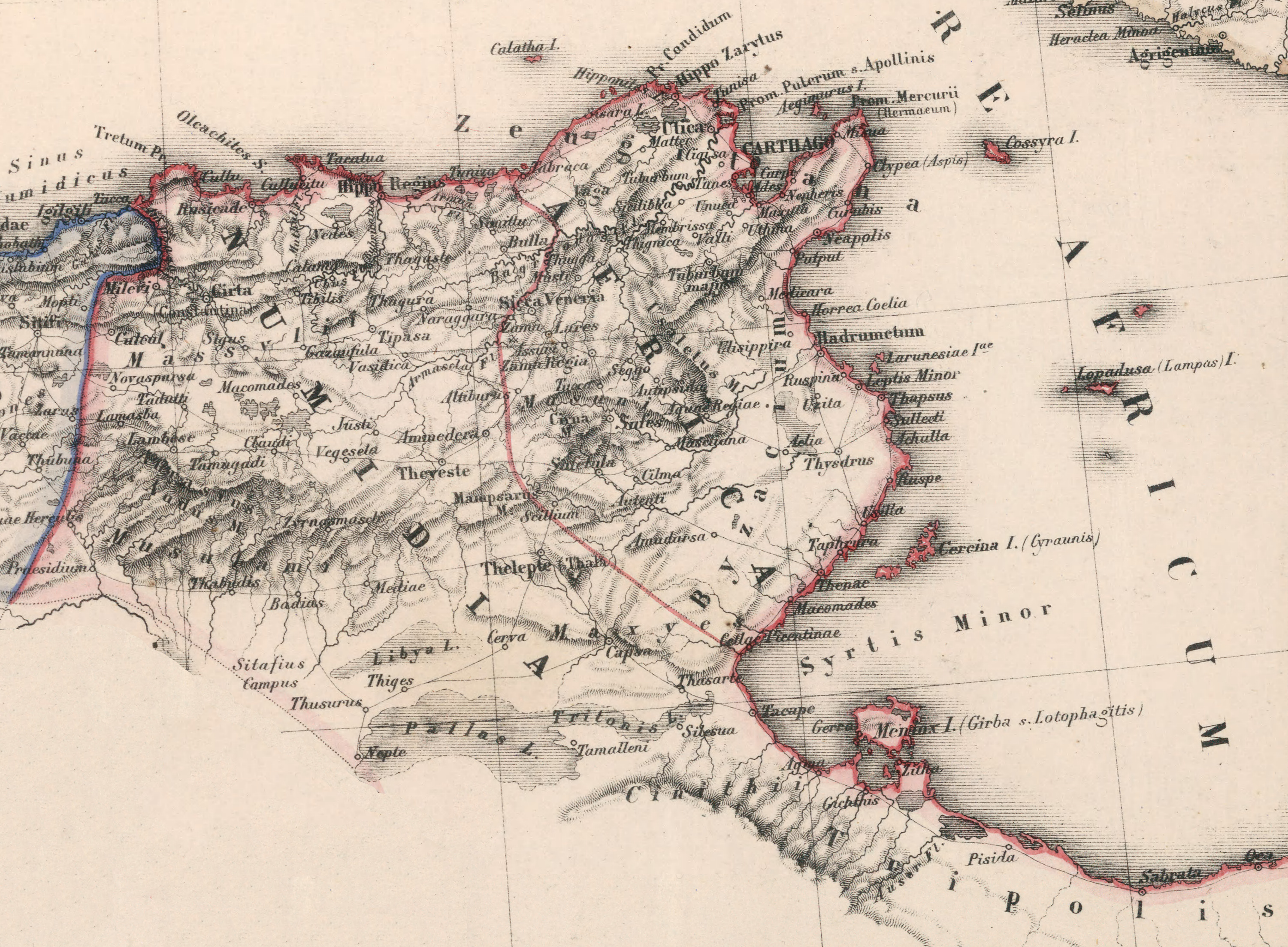
Map of Roman Africa, with the provinces of Byzacena, Zeugitana and Numidia

The Battle of Mammes, or Battle of Mamma, was an engagement in either 534 or 535, in the Valley of Mamma, south of modern Aïn Djeloula, between the Byzantine Empire and a coalition of Berber tribes. (Note: The battle is typically mentioned to have taken place in 534. Solomon returned from Constantinople to replace Belisarius in autumn 534, after which the rebellion started. He opened negotiations with the Berbers and waited for reinforcements from Justinian I, which were sent to him upon hearing that a rebellion was taking place. Taking into account these events, it explains why some authors place the battle in the spring of 535.)

Following the Byzantine victory in the Vandalic War (533–534) in Africa, Byzantine general Belisarius returned to Constantinople. However, he anticipated that Berbers would revolt on his departure, due to unkept promises. Before his departure, he placed most of his bucellarii under Solomon's command and instructed him to put down the rebellion. The Berbers revolted upon the news of Belisarius's departure and began raiding and pillaging Byzacena, ambushing and killing two Byzantine commanders and their forces, which started the Byzantine–Moorish wars. In spring 535, Solomon, along with reinforcements, led his troops to counter the Berber forces. The Berbers used a circle of camels to disrupt the Byzantine cavalry. The Byzantines then dismounted and attacked from the weaker flank, breaking the Berbers' lines. The Byzantines won decisively, reportedly slaughtering 10,000 Berbers and enslaving the women and children trapped at the center of the camel ring.

== Prelude ==
Byzantine general Belisarius, after his victory in the Vandalic War (533–534) in Africa, had to return to Constantinople to deal with rumors against him in the royal court of Justinian I. Belisarius anticipated that the Berbers, who, according to Procopius, had remained quiet largely out of fear of him, would revolt upon his departure. He placed most of his bucellarii under Solomon's command and instructed him to put down the rebellion. The Berbers rebelled on the news of Belisarius' departure.

The Berbers invaded Byzacena and defeated the local Byzantine garrison, ambushing and killing its commanders Aigan and Rufinus the Thracian, which damaged the morale of the Byzantine troops. After diplomatic entreaties over the winter failed, which the Berbers refused due to claiming that Belisarius made promises that he did not keep, and with his forces bolstered to some 18,000 men following the arrival of reinforcements, in spring 535, Solomon led his troops into Byzacena. The Berbers, under their chiefs Cutzinas, Esdilasas, Iourphouthes, and Mesidinissas, had encamped at a location called Mammes, on the borders of Mauretania and next to some mountains. He built a camp opposite the Berbers and prepared for battle.

Before the battle, Solomon, attempting to encourage his troops in a speech, said,

... most of them have no armour, and those who have shields, small ones which are not well made, holding them up are not able to turn aside what strikes against them. And after they have thrown those two small spears, if they do not accomplish anything, automatically they turn to flight.

== Battle ==
The Berbers relied heavily on camels as light cavalry, exploiting their ability to frighten enemy horses. They had previously used this tactic effectively against the Vandals by forming a circle with their camels, twelve ranks deep, at an earlier battle. This tactic rendered horse archery nearly useless. Foot soldiers stood among the camels, while the baggage train, women, and children were placed at the center. The same formation was deployed against the Byzantines. The Berber troops were lightly armed with shields, swords, and javelins. They concealed additional cavalry in the nearby mountains.

Solomon anticipated a trap, and thus he placed his men at the side of the defensive circle, not facing the mountains, to avoid being attacked from his rear. At the beginning of the battle, the Berbers' tactics were effective due to the Byzantine horse archers' inability to aim. An initial Byzantine cavalry charge was repulsed when the horses shied away from the camels. As such, Solomon directed his infantry to press the Berbers in front. Solomon proceeded to order his cavalry to dismount and protect themselves with their shields, and he also took 500 men and moved around the circle closest to the mountains and proceeded to attack from there. Solomon expected the defenses from that side to be weak and that a decisive attack would make rapid headway. Solomon's prediction was correct; the Byzantines swiftly broke through, cutting down two hundred camels in the process. The Berbers, shaken by this sudden development, abandoned their positions and fled, suffering heavy losses.

== Aftermath ==
The Byzantines enslaved the Moorish women and children, who were trapped in the middle of the circle, and according to contemporary historian Procopius, slew 10,000 men. Much of the loot captured was brought back to Carthage. Afterwards, Solomon focused on dealing with the Berber tribes raiding Byzacena. The Berbers would later be decisively defeated at Mount Bourgaon, marking the end of the first stage of the Berber revolt.

== Sources ==
=== Primary ===
- Procopius (545–553). History of the Wars – via Wikisource.

=== Secondary ===
- Bury, John B. (2013) [1958]. History of the later Roman Empire from the death of Theodosius II. to the death of Justinian. New York. ISBN 978-0-486-14339-2.
- Diehl, Charles (1896). L'Afrique Byzantine: Histoire de la Domination Byzantine en Afrique (533–709) (in French). Paris: Ernest Leroux. OCLC 3232191.
- Erdkamp, Paul, ed. (2011). A Companion to the Roman Army. West Sussex: Wiley. ISBN 978-1-444-39376-7.
  - Elton, Hugh. "Army and Battle in the Age of Justinian (527–65)". In Erdkamp (2011), pp. 532–550.
- Elton, Hugh (2018). The Roman Empire in Late Antiquity: A Political and Military History. Cambridge University Press. ISBN 978-0-521-89931-4.
- Holmes, Nick (2024). Justinian's Empire: Triumph and Tragedy. Puttenham Press Ltd. ISBN 978-1-7397865-6-4.
- Hughes, Ian (2014). Belisarius: the last Roman general. Barnsley. ISBN 978-1-4738-2297-9. OCLC 903161296.
- Merrills, Andrew H.; Merrills, Andy (2023). War, Rebellion and Epic in Byzantine North Africa. Cambridge: Cambridge University Press. ISBN 978-1-009-39198-6.
- Sarantis, Alexander; Christie, Neil, eds. (2013). War and Warfare in Late Antiquity (2 vols.): Current Perspectives. Brill. ISBN 978-9-004-25258-5.
- Syvänne, Ilkka (2021). Military History of Late Rome 518–565. Yorkshire, PA: Pen and Sword Military. ISBN 978-1-47-389530-0. OCLC 1251765729.
- Tougher, Shaun (2020). The Roman Castrati: Eunuchs in the Roman Empire. Bloomsbury Publishing. ISBN 978-1-350-16404-8.
- Taragna, Anna M. (2024). "Logoi Historias across Time: Evolution and Interrelationships in the Writing of Speeches and Letters in Byzantine Historical Works" (PDF). Parekvolai. 14: 115–170.
