= Othman Saadi =

Algerian writer, diplomat and politician (1930–2022)

- عثمان سعدي

Member of the People's National Assembly
- In office 1977–1982
- Constituency: Tébessa

Personal details
- Born: 1930 Tébessa, French Algeria
- Died: 30 November 2022 (aged 91–92) Algiers, Algeria
- Party: FLN; PPA
- Education: Cairo University; University of Baghdad; Algiers 1 University
- Occupation: Writer; Diplomat

Othman Saadi (Note: Arabic: عثمان سعدي, romanized: ʿUthmān Saʻdī) (1930 – 30 November 2022) was an Algerian writer, diplomat, and politician.

== Biography ==
Saadi joined the Algerian People's Party and later the National Liberation Front (FLN). He dropped out of French school after the Sétif and Guelma massacre. He graduated from the Institut Abdelhamid Ben Badis in Constantine in 1951 and subsequently earned a licentiate from Cairo University in 1956, a master's degree from the University of Baghdad in 1979, and a doctorate from Algiers 1 University in 1986.

Following his work for the National Liberation Army in Cairo, Saadi became head of Algeria's diplomatic mission in Kuwait and was subsequently chargé d'affaires in Cairo from 1968 to 1971. He then worked as a diplomat in Baghdad from 1971 to 1974 and in Damascus from 1974 to 1977.

Saadi was elected to the People's National Assembly in 1977 from the constituency of Tébessa as a member of the FLN. He served until 1982.

Othman Saadi died in Algiers on 30 November 2022.
