= Abu Bakr al-Maliki =

Historian from Ifriqiya

Abū Bakr ʿAbdallāh ibn Muḥammad ibn ʿAbdallāh al-Qurashī al-Qayrawānī al-Mālikī (fl. 1036–1057) was an Ifrīqiyan historian, Mālikī jurist and Ashʿarī theologian and traditionist. He played a major role in spreading Mālikism and Ashʿarism in Ifrīqiya.

Al-Mālikī was born in Kairouan. His father, Muḥammad, was trained in sharīʿa (law) and ḥadīth (tradition) and wrote a biography of the jurist Abu 'l-Ḥasan al-Qābiṣī. Al-Mālikī studied in Kairouan under Abū Bakr ibn ʿAbd al-Raḥmān and Muḥammad ibn ʿAbbās al-Anṣārī, who died in 1036. After studying for a time in the emirate of Sicily, he taught in Kairouan, where al-Māzarī was one of his students. According al-Dabbāgh, writing over two centuries later, al-Mālikī remained in Kairouan after the Hilālī sack of 1057, when most other scholars decamped to Mahdia. He died sometime after this date, perhaps in 1081 or 1097.

Only one work by al-Mālikī has survived, Riyāḍ al-nufūs ("Gardens of the Souls" or "Meadow of Souls"). It is a biographical dictionary of the Mālikīs of Ifrīqiya. It contains 275 biographies and is a valuable historical source. Later Muslim scholars who used it include al-Qāḍī ʿIyāḍ and al-Ṭurṭūshī. Al-Mālikī was probably inspired to write by the twin devastations of the Hilālī invasion and the Norman conquest of Sicily.

== Bibliography ==
- Hentati, Nejmeddine (2017). "al-Mālikī, Abū Bakr". In Fleet, Kate; Krämer, Gudrun; Matringe, Denis; Nawas, John; Rowson, Everett (eds.). Encyclopaedia of Islam (3rd ed.). Brill Online. doi:10.1163/1573-3912_ei3_COM_33118. ISSN 1873-9830.
- Hopley, Russell (2012). "Abu Bakr al-Maliki". In Emmanuel K. Akyeampong; Henry Louis Gates, Jr. (eds.). Dictionary of African Biography. Oxford University Press.
