= Ambush of Aigan and Rufinus =

- Part of the Byzantine–Moorish wars
| Date | Late 534 |
| Location | Inner regions Byzacena, modern day Tunisia |
| Result | Berber victory: Start of the Byzantine–Moorish wars |

Belligerents
| Berber tribes; Mastraciani | Byzantine Empire |

Commanders and leaders
| Cutzinas; Esdilasas; Mesdinissas; Iourphoutes | Aigan †; Rufinus (executed) |

The Ambush of Aigan and Rufinus was a clash between various Berber forces under the command four tribal chieftains spearheaded by the Mastraciani and their chief Cutzinas, and a force of Byzantine cavalry led by the acclaimed Hunnic commander Aigan and Rufinus. Preceding the ambush, these chieftains had already threatened the magister militum of the Praetorian prefecture of Africa, Solomon, who then threatened with keeping their children hostage in Carthage. During the battle, the Berbers first trapped the Byzantines in a narrow pass, in response to which the Byzantine soldiers began firing arrows and other projectiles at the Berbers to keep them at bay. However, when the Byzantines ran out of arrows the Berber forces closed in and slaughtered them. Aigan was killed in combat, while Rufinus was first captured, but then the chieftain Medinissas beheaded him to show his head off as a trophy.

The ambush had severe consequences and was the first military action in the Byzantine–Moorish wars, a series of conflicts with varying intensity across North Africa that would last for 14 years.
