= Iaudas =

Berber leader

- Dux of the Aurasitana manus

King of the Aurès
- Reign: c. 516–548
- Predecessor: Masties
- Successor: eventually Kahina
- Died: after 548
- Spouse: Mephanias' daughter
- Issue: Bezina
- Greek: Ιαύδας
- Berber: ⵢⴰⴱⴷⴰⵙ (Yabdas)

Iaudas or Iabdas was a Berber leader of the sixth century and king of the Kingdom of the Aurès who held the Byzantines in check for a long time in the Aurès, and played an important role in the Berber revolts following the Byzantine reconquest.

== Life and career ==
Iaudas was the son-in-law of Mephanias, another tribal chief, whom he assassinated, and the brother-in-law of Massônas, son of Méphanias. According to Corippus, he was the dux of the Aurasitana manus, i.e. the leader of the Auresian army, and according to Procopius, the leader of the Berbers of Aurasion. The latter also describes him as being “of all the Moors the handsomest and most valiant”.

== Prelude ==
Following the Byzantine conquest of the Vandal Kingdom in 533–534, Emperor Justinian presented the African campaign to the Eastern Roman population as a defense of the Nicene Christian population of Africa. Initially characterized by religious pragmatism, the occupation soon shifted under pressure from African bishops and the Pope, Justinian then issued legislation to enforce Nicene Christianity, as indicated in Novella 37, which prohibited the practices of Jews, pagans, Donatists, and Arians. Belisarius, on the other hand, met Moorish chiefs and sought to integrate the African provinces by honoring the local Donatist cult of martyrs, blending Byzantine saints with North African martyrs, and establishing shrines and chapels in their honor.

As Belisarius was recalled to Europe and replaced by Solomon, the suppression of Donatist practices took sway and led to growing resentment, alienating Iaudas and his followers, many of whom were sympathetic to the Donatist church.

== War ==
At the beginning of 535, while the Byzantine general Solomon was busy dealing with the revolt of the Berbers of Byzacena, led by the chiefs Cutzinas, Esdilasas, Medisinissas and Iourphouthès, Iaudas took the opportunity to take his 30,000 warriors to invade and plunder the countryside of Numidia, as far as the region of Tigisis (present-day Aïn el-Bordj, in Algeria), taking a large number of prisoners. Procopius relates that the officer Althias, placed in the city of Centuria, in charge of guarding the forts of this canton, and his small federated army of 70 cavalrymen, met Iaudas soon after, near the water source of Tigisis; Iaudas wanted to have access to water from the fountain for his men "devoured by the ardent thirst produced by fatigue and the heat, because it was then at the height of summer", while Althias wanted to recover some prisoners from Iaudas. In order to settle the dispute, the two leaders fought face to face in single combat. Iaudas, terrified by the dexterity of Althias, who killed his horse, fled with his army in disorder. All loot and prisoners were collected by the Byzantines.

In 534–535, the Berbers of Byzacena, insurgents against the new power, were defeated by Solomon during the battles of Mammes and Mount Bourgaon, which placed Iaudas in the front line against the Empire. He stood up, first welcoming the survivors of the insurrection, like Cutzinas, then resisting Solomon's advance in the Aurès.

Solomon, with two Berber chiefs, Masuna, who sought revenge for his father, assassinated by Iaudas, and Orthaïas, victim of a conspiracy by Iaudas and Mastigas, advanced against the Aurès. He challenged Iaudas to battle, but after three days his soldiers grew suspicious of the loyalty of the Berbers. As a result, Solomon abandoned the campaign and did not engage in conflict with them again until 537 due to a mutiny by the Byzantine army in the spring of 536.

Iaudas reappears in the sources in 537 when he joined Stotzas, the leader of a major Byzantine army mutiny, and reconciled with one of his old rivals, Orthaïas, who commanded Berber tribes located west of the Aurès. In the Battle of Scalas Veteres, Iaudas and the other Berber chieftains accompanying Stotzas fell back and Stotzas was defeated. In 539, Solomon had a second and meticulous campaign in the heart of the Aurès, this time decisive: Iaudas was hunted down, and had to give in after a long resistance. He lost his treasure, his wives (or his concubines), and was wounded in the thigh by a javelin, but did not capitulate: he chose exile in Mauretania, perhaps with his old ally, Mastigas.

The great revolt of the tribes of Tripolitania and Byzacena, 5 years later, however, enabled him to achieve a spectacular recovery. In 544, Solomon and his troops were crushed at the Battle of Sufetula by the Berber leader Antalas, the Byzantine general was himself killed.

At the end of 545, he emerged again to attack the Empire at the head of an army from Numidia, in which he joined the great coalition of insurgents led by Antalas and the Laguatan, and participated with them, in 546, in the negotiations with another Byzantine dissenter, the usurper of Vandal origin Guntarith, and then in the war waged against the new general sent by Justinian, replacing Solomon, John Troglita. In coalition with Guntharic, he and Cutzinas headed for Carthage, while the Berber leader Antalas pounded and invaded Byzacena. Carthage was taken, however, Guntharic was a victim of a conspiracy and was assassinated by Artabanes. Shortly after, the city was taken over by the Byzantines.

In the summer of 546, Iaudas was definitively defeated by the Byzantine general John Troglita, he was not forced to flee this time, but had to accept the tutelage of the Byzantines. Indeed, he reappears in the sources only in 547/548 and 548, to provide soldiers at the call of John Troglita, and to follow their army when it has to fight against a new attack from the tribes of Tripolitania. He participated in the victorious Battle of the Fields of Cato against Antalas and Carcasan and provided a contingent of 12,000 men according to Corippus, who presents him as the famulatus Iaudas, the only one who, in the descriptions of the Berber auxiliaries in the Johannide, appears as an ally in spite of himself, who acts under duress.

== Sources ==
- Bury, John Bagnell (1958). History of the later Roman Empire from the death of Theodosius I. to the death of Justinian. Vol. 2. New York: Dover publ. ISBN 9780486203980. OCLC 41478187.
- Corippus (1900). Johannide (in French). Vol. VII. Tunis: Revue tunisienne.
- Courtois, Christian (1955). Les Vandales et l'Afrique (PDF) (in French). Paris: Arts et métiers graphiques. Archived from the original (PDF) on February 22, 2024.
- Desanges, Jehan (1963). "Un témoignage peu connu de Procope sur la Numidie vandale et byzantine". Byzantion. 33 (1): 41–69. JSTOR 44169071.
- Diehl, Charles (1896). L'Afrique byzantine: histoire de la domination byzantine en Afrique (533-709) (in French). Paris: Leroux.
- Janon, Michel (1980). "L'Aurès au VIe siècle. Note sur le récit de Procope". Antiquités africaines (in French). 15 (1): 345–351. doi:10.3406/antaf.1980.1053. ISSN 0066-4871.
- Lugan, Bernard; Fournel, André (2009). Histoire de l'Afrique - des origines à nos jours (in French). Ellipses. ISBN 978-2729842680.
- Maraval, Pierre (24 March 2016). Histoire de l'Afrique - Le rêve d'un empire chrétien universel (in French). Tallandier. ISBN 979-10-210-1643-9.
- Martindale, John Robert; Jones, A. H. M.; Morris, John (1980). The Prosopography of the Later Roman Empire. II - A.D. 395–527. Cambridge University Press. ISBN 978-0-521-20159-9.
- Martindale, John Robert; Jones, A. H. M.; Morris, John (1992). The Prosopography of the Later Roman Empire - Volume III, AD 527–641. Cambridge (GB): Cambridge University Press. ISBN 0-521-20160-8.
- Modéran, Yves (1 June 2011). Encyclopédie berbère (in French). Vol. 23.
- Modéran, Yves (2013-05-22). Les Maures et l'Afrique romaine (in French). Publications de l’École française de Rome. ISBN 978-2-7283-1003-6.
- Morizot, Pierre (1993). "Recherches sur les campagnes de Solomon en Numidie méridionale (535-589)". Comptes rendus des séances de l'Académie des Inscriptions et Belles-Lettres (in French). 137 (1): 83–106. doi:10.3406/crai.1993.15188. ISSN 0065-0536.
- Procopius (1852). Histoire de la Guerre des Vandales (in French). Paris: Firmin Didot.
