= Masties =

5th century North African ruler

- Dux and Augustus of the Aurès
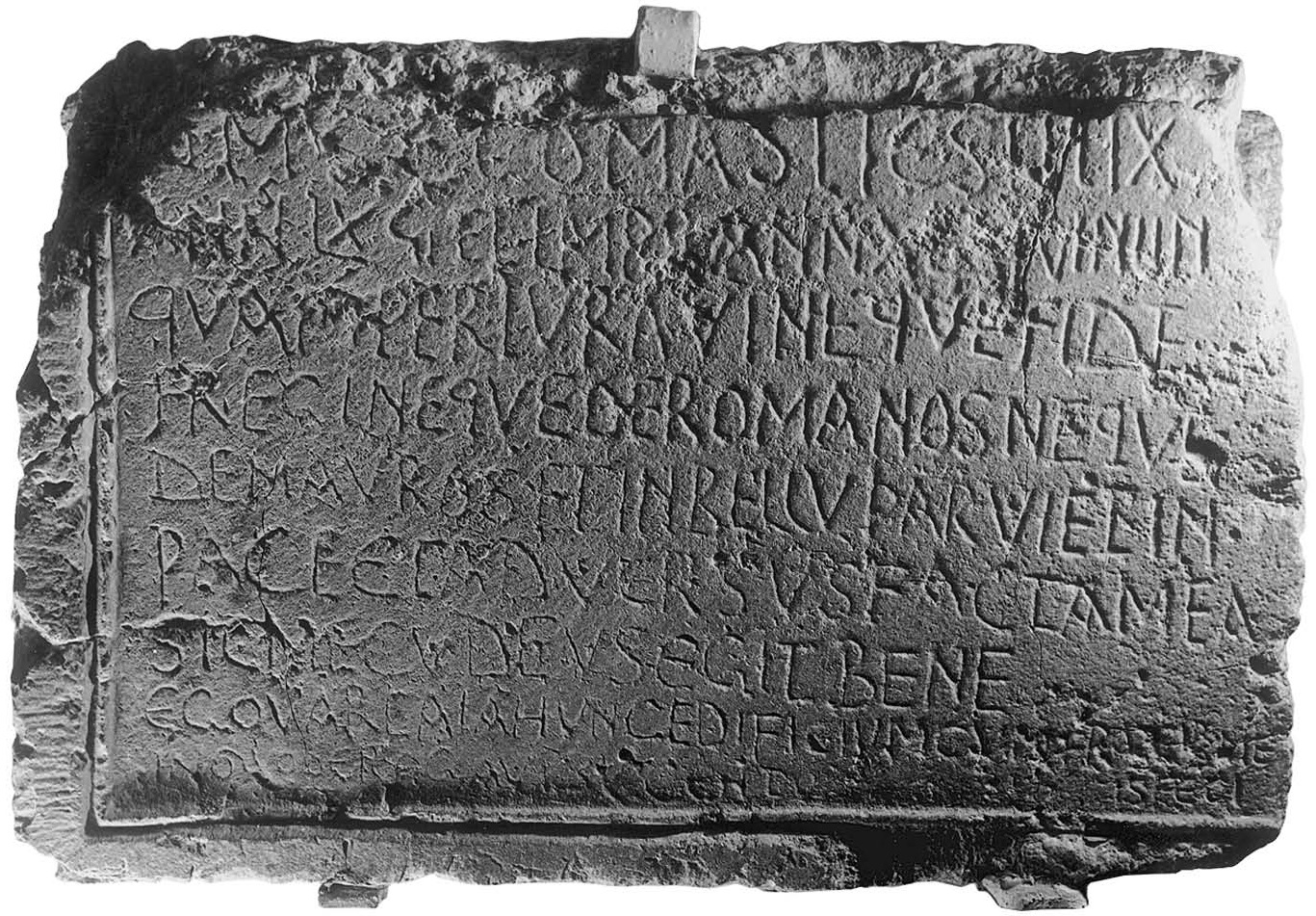
- Masties inscription found in Arris

Emperor of the Aurès
- Reign: 484 — 494/516
- Predecessor: Foundation of the kingdom
- Successor: Iaudas
Pre-imperial positions
Dux
In office c. 426 – 494/516
Monarch	Valentinian III (?)
- Born: c. 410
- Died: c. 494 or 516 (aged 80-100); Kingdom of the Aurès
- Religion: Nicene Christianity

Masties (reigned c. 484–494?) was the Dux and later self proclaimed emperor of the Kingdom of the Aures, a Romano-Berber polity in the former Roman province of Numidia.

Masties is known from an undated Latin epitaph from his presumed capital Arris in Aurès, found in 1941 by Morizot and published in detail by Carcopino in 1944.

Masties was first made dux in around 426 and died in 494, presumably in his eighties, as has been recently suggested.

However, Pierre Morizot identified Masties with Mastigas, the mauro-roman king. An identification which, if proven correct, would call into question the possible dates for Masties’ reign in the Aurès, given that Mastigas was active during the 530s–540s a period by which Masties would have already been dead for more than 20 years.

== Rise to Power ==
The rise of Masties is linked to the 484 revolt of Aurasium described by Procopius, which pushed the Aurès permanently outside the orbit of Vandal control, and which may have been given energy by the persecutions of the Arian king Huneric against Orthodox Christians (484), memorably recorded by Victor of Vita.

In 484 AD, the Vandal king Huneric initiated a persecution against Nicene Christians within his kingdom. Concurrently, according to Procopius, the Aurès region broke with Vandal rule. Prompted by this persecution, Masties is believed to have adopted the title "imperator," moving towards autonomy in the 480s.

Masties made a clear appeal to Christians, referencing that “God gave his kindness to me” and using the cross as a symbol. He capitalized on the indignation felt by Christians in Aurès, providing an alternative in Roman and Christian terms for the population. His claims of divine favor aligned with the post-Constantinian political model.

Modéran argues that the villages, churches, and countryside of the Aurès, outside Vandal control, offered a productive rural powerbase from which Masties had drawn the necessary means for an emergent Romano- Berber identity that cemented his authority and provided to the people of the region “a sense of ethnic cohesion and identity” contributing in the process to the weakening of the Vandals and their subsequent defeat by Belisarius.

in the detailed evaluation of Greg Fisher and Alexander Drost, Masties rise to power can be attributed to a strong military personality, offering a link to Roman power and also tolerance to those escaping Vandal persecution, quoted as saying "Times and circumstances might have changed, but the desirability and requirement of a hybrid appearance clearly had not". This evaluation is convincingly backed by the number of African clerics (4,966) arriving at N'gaous escorted by Moorish guards after they were gathered and exiled by the Vandal king Huneric in 483.

Since the days of Juba and Masinissa, centuries of contacts between Romans and Berbers had allowed Masties to assume Roman military leadership and titles, The Berber elite was thus more acceptable than their contemporary Arab counterparts notes Greg Fisher and Alexander Drost.

Masties was later succeeded by Iaudas.

== Inscription ==
The majority of the text of the inscription is presented as self-eulogy, narrated by Masties himself. In the penultimate line, however, while the text remains in the first-person, the speaker changes, allowing the donor of the inscription, Vartaia, to note his own involvement.

D.S.M. [sacred to the spirits of the departed] I, Masties, dux for sixtyseven years, imperator for ten years, ☩ [cross], I never betrayed, nor broke the faith, neither with the Romans, nor with the Moors and I obeyed in war as in peace, and for that, by reason for my conduct, God gave his kindness to me. I, Vartaia, erected with my brothers this monument, for which I paid one hundred solidi.

Masties’ emphasis on faith (fides) in the inscription was well noted as a potential push-back against the contemporary literature stereotype of Moors being faithless (infidus), however the inscription opening with the phrase D.S.M. (dis sacrum manibus) has also been interpreted as a strict pagan or Donatist cult reference, thus the man acted out of pure political opportunism.

=== Titles ===
The term “Dux” appears alongside “imperator” on the inscription of Masties. Carcopino suggested that Masties might have been appointed as Dux, in the sense of the Roman military command, by Valentinian III, but this is hard to verify as nothing else is known about Masties's career.

It appears to be far more likely, that the title Dux simply continued to be used for the hereditary leaders of Berber tribes during the Vandal period. This view is supported by the case of Masties himself. Given that he held the title for 67 years, he must have assumed it at a relatively young age. The presence of the Berber leader Iaudas in the Aurès in the 530s, identified as dux in the Johannis and a possible successor to Masties, might suggest that Masties had succeeded in building a political structure that outlasted him.

Historian John Moorhead accepts that Masties was a usurper emperor for forty years.

== Historical sources ==
- Funeral inscription found in the Aurès mountains at Arris (L'Année Épigraphique 1945: 97, ECDS entry, EDH entry HD019959)

== Bibliography ==
- Michael Maas: The Cambridge Companion to the Age of Attila. Cambridge University Press, 2014, ISBN 9781316060858, pp. 277-278
- Andrew Merrills & Richard Miles (2009), The Vandals, Wiley, pp. 127–128, ISBN 9781444318081
- Philip Rosseau (ed.): A Companion to Late Antiquity. Wiley, 2012, ISBN 9781118293478, p. 579
- John Robert Martindale (1980), Masties. In: The Prosopography of the Later Roman Empire - Volume 2, Cambridge: Cambridge University Press, p. 734, ISBN 0-521-20159-4.
- Jehan Desanges: À propos de Masties, imperator berbère et chrétien. In: Ktema 21, 1996, pp. 183–188.
- Paul-Albert Février: Masuna et Masties. In: Antiquités africaines 24, 1988, pp. 133–147 (online copy).
- Pierre Morizot: Pour une nouvelle lecture de l'Elogium de Masties. In: Antiquités africaines 25, 1989, pp. 263–284.
- Pierre Morizot: Masties a-t-il été imperator? In: Zeitschrift für Papyrologie und Epigraphik 141, 2002, pp. 231–240 (JSTOR)
- Yves Modéran (2003), Les Maures and l'Afrique romaine. 4e.-7e. siècle (= Bibliothèque des écoles françaises d'Athènes et de Rome, vol. 314) (in French), Rome: Publications de l'École française de Rome, ISBN 2-7283-0640-0
