= Esdilasas =

Esdilasas (Greek: Ἐσδιλάσας) was a Moorish tribal leader active during the rebellion in the province of Byzacena. In 534 and 535, he was among the Moorish leaders who rebelled against Byzantine authority in Africa. In late 534, he, along with the Berber tribal leaders Cutzinas, Iurfutes and Medisiníssas, defeated the Byzantine officers Aigan and Rufinus. In 535, however, the rebels were defeated by the Byzantine military commander Solomon, first at Mammes, then at Bourgaon. In the aftermath of Bourgaon, Esdilasas surrendered and was taken to Carthage.

== Sources ==
- Martindale, John Robert; Jones, Arnold Hugh Martin; Morris, J., eds. (1992). The Prosopography of the Later Roman Empire, Volume III: A.D. 527–641. Cambridge: Cambridge University Press. ISBN 978-0-521-20160-5.
