= Ortaias =

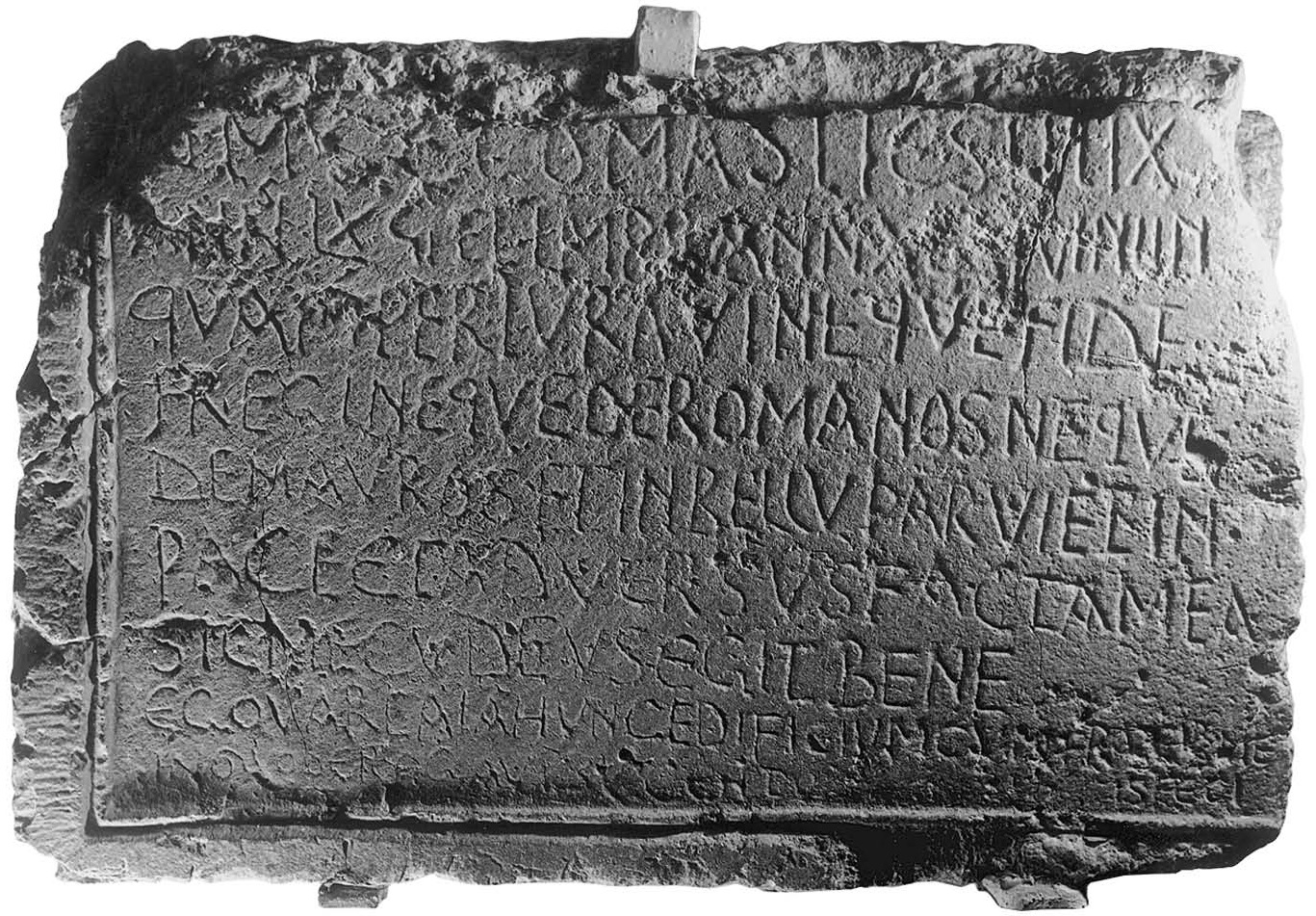
- The Masties inscription calls him Vartaia and claims that he along with his "brothers" erected this monument in Masties' honor

King of Hodna
- Reign: known to have been active around 535/537-c. 539?
- Predecessor: Creation of the kingdom
- Successor: None, likely annexed by the Praetorian prefect of Africa
- Died: c. 539 or after
- Greek: Ορταιας
- Religion: Christianity

Orthaias sometimes called Ortaïas or Vartaia (Ancient Greek: Ορταιας) was a 6th-century Berber leader who ruled as king of Hodna. He is currently the only known ruler from this kingdom.

It is likely that his kingdom was conquered or absorbed by the Byzantine Empire around 539 after the Praetorian prefect of Africa, Solomon returned land that included the kingdom's territory "into Roman power".

== Biography ==
=== Role ===
He played a significant role in the Byzantine Empire's wars against rebellious Berber tribes. In 535, he allied himself with the Byzantine general Solomon against Iaudas, who was accused of conspiring with Mastigas to expel him and his people from their ancestral lands. He received a large sum of money from Solomon and, along with Masônas, was tasked with leading the Byzantine army. However, the campaign ultimately failed; the Byzantine army ran out of supplies and, distrustful of its allies' loyalty, chose to retreat to the plains.

In 537, he joined the rebellion of the officer Stotzas (as he wasn't king yet) alongside Iaudas and other berber chiefs but he stayed behind during the Battle de Scalas Veteres and it was lost by Stotzas.

=== Inscription ===
An inscription at Arris in the Aurès Mountains, in which the Berber chieftain Masties is praised, appears to mention Ortaias, who is credited with its design. The authors of Prosopography of the Later Roman Empire interpret the presence of his name as an addition by the Byzantines to mock him.

The majority of the text of the inscription is presented as self-eulogy, narrated by Masties himself. In the penultimate line, however, while the text remains in the first-person, the speaker changes, allowing the donor of the inscription, Ortaias (who's referred as Vartaia on the inscription), to note his own involvement.

D.S.M. [sacred to the spirits of the departed] I, Masties, dux for sixtyseven years, imperator for ten years, ☩ [cross], I never betrayed, nor broke the faith, neither with the Romans, nor with the Moors and I obeyed in war as in peace, and for that, by reason for my conduct, God gave his kindness to me. I, Vartaia, erected with my brothers this monument, for which I paid one hundred solidi.
