= Aigan (Hun commander) =

Hun general

Aigan or Aïgan (Greek: Ἀϊγάν; late 5th century or early 6th century – 534) was a Hun general serving as a cavalry commander for the Byzantine Empire, active in the early 6th century.

== Biography ==
Aigan commanded a body of Hun cavalry at the Battle of Dara against the Sasanians, terrifying the Persians. He was fundamental in the Byzantine victory.

He then participated in the Byzantine expedition against the Vandalic Kingdom in 533, being one of the four cavalry commanders under Belisarius. He remained in Africa to serve under Solomon after Belisarius returned to Constantinople in the summer of 534.

In 534 as tensions rose between various Moorish (Berber) chieftains and the central Byzantine authority, he and Rufinus the Thracian were sent out on patrol to the countryside. They ambushed a Moorish raiding party, whom they killed, and released their prisoners. Thereafter they were in turn ambushed by a Moorish army overwhelmingly greater in number (they were possibly 500 against 50,000). They put up a brave fight but were eventually defeated. His fellow cavalry commander Rufinus was beheaded, and his head was carried off by Moorish chieftain Medisinissas.
