= Kingdom of the Aurès =

Government in North Africa

Kingdom of the Aurès Regnum Aurasium
- c. 484–703
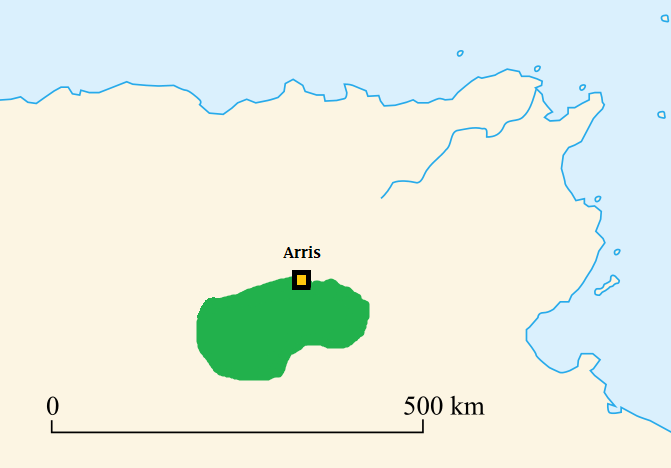
- The approximate extent of the Kingdom of the Aurès around the time of the collapse of the Vandal Kingdom
- Capital: Arris (400s – 500s); Khenchela (600s – 700s)^{a}
- Common languages: Berber, African Romance
- Religion: Chalcedonian Christianity
- Government: Monarchy
- King
  - c. 484 – c. 516: Masties
  - c. 516 – 548: Iaudas
  - 668–703: Dihya
- Historical era: Middle Ages
  - Separation from the Western Roman Empire: 429
  - Revolt against Huneric: 484
  - Byzantine conquest after the Aures campaign: 539
  - Re-establishment of the kingdom after the Battle of Cillium: 544
  - Muslim conquest of the Maghreb: 703
Preceded by	Succeeded by
Vandal Kingdom	Umayyad Caliphate
- Today part of: Algeria
- 1. Khenchela was the base of operations of the final ruler Dihya, if it was truly the capital of the kingdom is unknown.

The Kingdom of the Aurès (Latin: Regnum Aurasium) was an independent Christian Berber kingdom primarily located in the Aurès Mountains of present-day north-eastern Algeria. Established in the 480s by King Masties following a series of Berber revolts against the Vandal Kingdom, which had conquered the Roman province of Africa in 435 AD, with a small interruption of Byzantine occupation from 539 to 544 AD during the Moorish wars and the Aurès campaign, the kingdom would last as an independent realm until the Muslim conquest of the Maghreb in 703 AD when its last monarch, Queen Dihya, was slain in battle.

Much like the larger Mauro-Roman Kingdom, the Kingdom of the Aurès combined aspects of Roman and Berber culture in order to efficiently rule over a population composed of both Roman provincials and Berber tribespeople. For instance, King Masties used the title of Dux and later Imperator to legitimize his rule and openly declared himself a Christian. Despite this, Aurès would not recognize the suzerainty of the remaining Roman Empire in the East and King Iaudas unsuccessfully invaded the Praetorian prefecture of Africa, established after the Byzantines had defeated the Vandals. One possible reason towards why the Berbers could not be integrated as successfully into the Byzantine Empire as they had been before was the Byzantine shift in language from Latin to Greek, the Berbers were thus no longer bilingual with the language of their nominal rulers.

Despite these hostilities, the Byzantines supported Aurès during the Muslim invasion of the Maghreb, hoping that the kingdom could act as a resistance to the Arabs. The final Queen of the kingdom, Dihya, was the final leader of the Berber resistance against the Arabs, which ended with her death and the fall of the Kingdom of the Aurès in 703 AD.

== History ==
=== Establishment ===
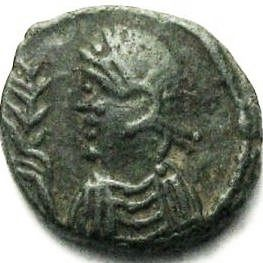
According to Procopius, the unpopular policies attempted by the Vandal king Huneric (coin pictured) in the late 470s, combined with the fact that the powerful king Geiseric had recently died, prompted large-scale Berber revolts against the Vandals. The revolt of Masties led to the establishment of the Kingdom of the Aurés.

According to the Eastern Roman historian Procopius, the Moors only began to truly expand and consolidate their power following the death of the powerful vandal king Gaiseric in 477 AD, after which they won many victories against the Vandal kingdom and established more or less full control over the former province of Mauretania. Having feared Gaiseric, the Moors under Vandal control revolted against his successor Huneric following his attempt to convert them to Arian Christianity and the harsh punishments incurred on those who did not convert. In the Aurès Mountains, this led to the foundation of the independent Kingdom of the Aurès, which was fully independent by the time of Huneric's death in 484 AD and would never again come under Vandal rule. Under the rule of Huneric's successors Gunthamund and Thrasamund, the wars between the Berbers and the Vandals continued. During Thrasamund's reign, the Vandals suffered a disastrous defeat at the hands of a Berber king ruling the city Tripolis, named Cabaon, who almost completely destroyed a Vandal army that had been sent to subjugate the city.

As the new Berber kingdoms adopted the military, religious and sociocultural organization of the Roman Empire, they continued to be fully within the Western Latin world. The administrative structure and titulature used by the Berber rulers suggests a certain romanized political identity in the region. This Roman political identity was maintained not only in the large Mauro-Roman Kingdom but in smaller kingdoms, such as the Kingdom of the Aurès, where King Masties claimed the title of Imperator during his rule around 516 AD, postulating that he had not broken trust with either his Berber or Roman subjects.

Masties had established a realm in Numidia and the Aurés Mountains, with the Arris as his own residence, and used Imperator to legitimize his rule over the Roman provincials, also openly declaring himself a Christian during his rebellion against Huneric. According to his own 516 AD inscription, Masties had reigned for 67 years as a dux, and 10 years as Imperator up until that point.

=== Vandalic War and its aftermath ===
Byzantine records referring to the Vandal Kingdom, which had occupied much of the old Roman province of Africa and coastal parts of Mauretania, often refer to it with regards to a trinity of peoples; Vandals, Alans and Moors, and though some Berbers had assisted the Vandals in their conquests in Africa, Berber expansion was more often than not focused against the Vandals rather than with them, which would lead to some expansion of even the smaller local kingdoms, such as the Aurès.

Following the Byzantine re-conquest of the Vandal Kingdom, the local governors began to experience problems with the local Berber tribes. The province of Byzacena was invaded and the local garrison, including the commanders Gainas and Rufinus, was defeated. The newly appointed Praetorian prefect of Africa, Solomon, waged several wars against these Berber tribes, leading an army of around 18,000 men into Byzacena. Solomon would defeat them and return to Carthage, though the Berbers would again rise and overrun Byzacena. Solomon would once again defeat them, this time decisively, scattering the Berber forces. Surviving Berber soldiers retreated into Numidia where they joined forces with Iaudas, King of the Aurès. Masuna, King of the Mauro-Roman Kingdom and allied with the Byzantines, and another Berber king, Ortaias (who ruled a kingdom in the former province of Mauretania Sitifensis), urged Solomon to pursue the enemy Berbers into Numidia, which he did. Solomon did not engage Iaudas in battle however, distrusting the loyalty of his allies, and instead constructed a series of fortified posts along the roads linking Byzacena with Numidia.

Though the Roman Empire had once exercised control over the Berbers and the Berbers continued to nominally respect Roman authority during Byzantine rule over North Africa, they could not be as easily integrated as before partly due to the Byzantine shift in language from Latin to Greek, the Berbers were no longer bilingual with the language of their nominal rulers.

=== Wars against the Arabs ===
Despite previous hostilities, the Byzantine Empire supported the Kingdom of the Aurès during the Muslim conquest of the Maghreb, hoping that the kingdom would act as resistance to the Arabs. Even with the fall of the Mauro-Roman kingdom in the 570s, its capital of Altava appears to have somewhat remained a seat of Berber power. The Altavan king Kusaila, the last Berber king to rule from Altava, died fighting against the Umayyad Caliphate. At the Battle of Mamma in 690 AD, a combined Byzantine-Altavan army was defeated and Kusaila was killed.

With the death of Kusaila, the torch of resistance passed to a tribe known as the Jerawa tribe, who had their home in the Aurès Mountains: his Christian Berber troops after his death fought later under Dihya, the queen of the Kingdom of the Aurès and the last ruler of the romanized Berbers. Dihya led the Berber resistance against the Arabs but was killed in battle in 703 AD near a well that still bears her name, Bir al Kahina ("Kahina" coming from al-Kāhina, her nickname in Arabic), in Aures.

== List of known kings and queens of the Aurès ==
Monarch	Reign	Notes
Masties	c. 484 – c. 516	Founded the kingdom following a revolt against the Vandal king Huneric. Claimed the title Imperator.
Iaudas	c. 516 – 539	Led a short-lived conflict against the newly re-conquered Byzantine North Africa. Fled to Mauretania following his defeat at the hands of the Byzantines in 539 AD.
Dihya	c. 668 – 703	Ruling Queen. The final ruler of Aurès and the romanized Berbers. Said to have ruled for 35 years, ruler of the entire Berber resistance from 690 AD onwards.
