= Arsaces (conspirator) =

Byzantine general and conspirator

Arsaces (Greek: Ἀρσάκης) was a Byzantine conspirator against Emperor Justinian I (r. 527–565). He was the instigator of Artabanes's conspiracy. The main source about him is Procopius.

== Biography ==
Arsaces was an Armenian and a descendant of the Arsacid dynasty of Armenia. He was also a kinsman of the general Artabanes, though the exact relation is not recorded.

At some point, Arsaces established correspondence with Khosrau I (r. 531–579), ruler of the Sassanid Empire. He was caught by imperial authorities and accused of treason. He was convicted, but Emperor Justinian I (r. 527–565) reserved for him a relatively mild punishment. Arsaces was sentenced to a public flagellation, while paraded through the streets of Constantinople on the back of a camel. The punishment was aimed to leave him physically unharmed but humiliated. Arsaces was not grateful to Emperor Justinian, holding a grudge. Procopius does not mention the date or context of the events. Modern historians suggest it was part of the early phases of the Lazic War (541–562).

Arsaces became the instigator of a conspiracy against the Byzantine emperor in 548. The plot formed shortly following the death of Theodora on June 28, 548. He first approached his kinsman Artabanes, who had his own reasons to be dissatisfied with Emperor Justinian. He previously had the ambition to marry Praejecta, niece of the Byzantine emperor. However, Theodora had thwarted this plan and Praejecta had married another man. Arsaces was able to turn this dissatisfaction to hatred. Chanaranges, "a young and frivolous Armenian" was also recruited. His motivations are not recorded. The name probably derives from Kanarang, a military title of the Sassanid Empire. He should probably not be confused with his contemporary, the Chanaranges who took part in the Gothic War (535–554).

Arsaces reportedly planned to take advantage of the personal habits of Emperor Justinian. The Byzantine emperor spent his nights "till late hours" in study of the Bible. He was surrounded by elderly priests instead of guards. The conspirators could take advantage of this lax security. However, the conspirators first needed to gain more support. They attempted to recruit members of Emperor Justinian's own family: Germanus and his sons Justin and Justinian.

Arsaces approached Justin and attempted to convince him about the reasons to eliminate Emperor Justinian. He discussed how the Byzantine emperor "ill-treated and passed over his relatives". He also pointed Belisarius as a threat to them. This did not have the desired effect. Immediately, Justin informed his father, and he in turn informed the comes excubitorum Marcellus. In order to find out more of their intentions, Germanus met the conspirators in person, while a trusted aide of Marcellus was concealed nearby and listened in. Although Marcellus hesitated to inform Emperor Justinian without further proof, eventually he revealed the conspiracy to the Byzantine emperor. Justinian ordered the conspirators imprisoned and questioned, but they were otherwise treated remarkably leniently. Artabanes was stripped of his offices and confined to the palace under guard, but was soon pardoned. The further fate of Arsaces is not recorded.

== Sources ==
- Bury, John Bagnell (1958) [1923]. History of the Later Roman Empire: From the Death of Theodosius I to the Death of Justinian, Volume 2. Mineola, New York: Dover Publications. OCLC 41478187.
- Martindale, John R., ed. (1992). The Prosopography of the Later Roman Empire: Volume III, AD 527–641. Cambridge: Cambridge University Press. ISBN 0-521-20160-8.
