= Sergius (Byzantine general) =

Sergius (Byzantine general under Justinian I)

Serge
- Born: Dara, Mesopotamia
- Occupations: General and governor
- Years active: 6th century
- Father: Bacchus
- Relatives: Solomon (magister militum) (brother); Cyrus (brother); Solomon (uncle)

Sergius (Greek: Σέργιος) was a Byzantine military officer who was active in Byzantine Africa during the reign of the emperor Justinian I (r. 527–565). The son of a priest named Bacchus, he was the brother of two Byzantine officers (Cyrus and Solomon) and nephew of the famous general Solomon. When appointed governor of Tripolitania, he murdered 80 of the leaders of the Laguatan, which intensified hostilities with the Moorish tribes.

He participated in the Battle of Cilium in which his uncle was killed and would become the praefecti praetorio Africae (praetorian prefect of Africa). In this position, he adopted a negligent attitude toward the problems faced in the province, making himself unpopular. Upon learning of the difficulties in Africa, Justinian sent the officials Areobindus and Athanasius to share power with Sergius. This proved even more disastrous, and Sergius was recalled. Sometime later, at the request of Belisarius, he was sent to Italy with an army.

== Biography ==
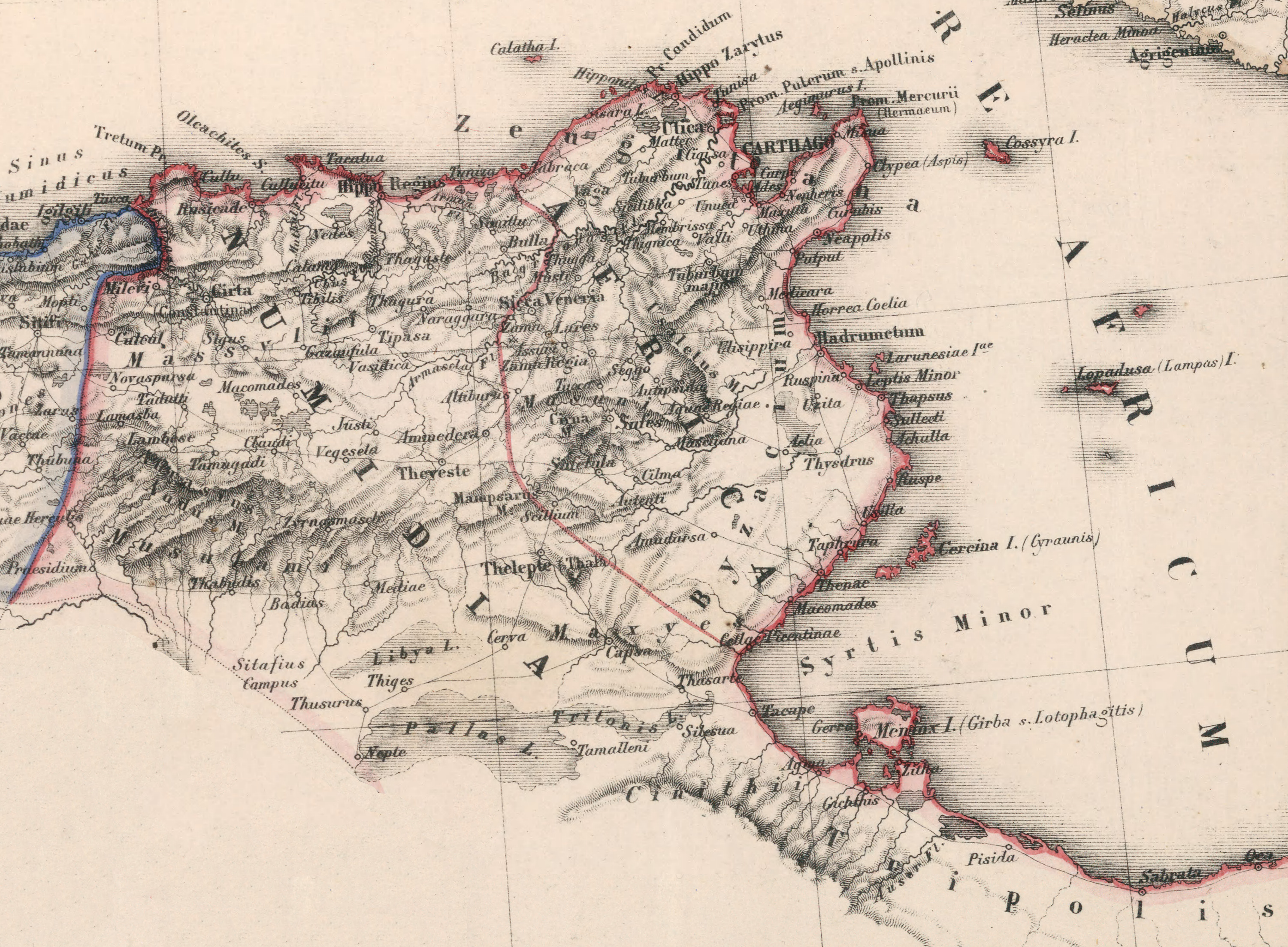
Roman Africa, with the provinces of Byzacena, Zeugitania and Numidia

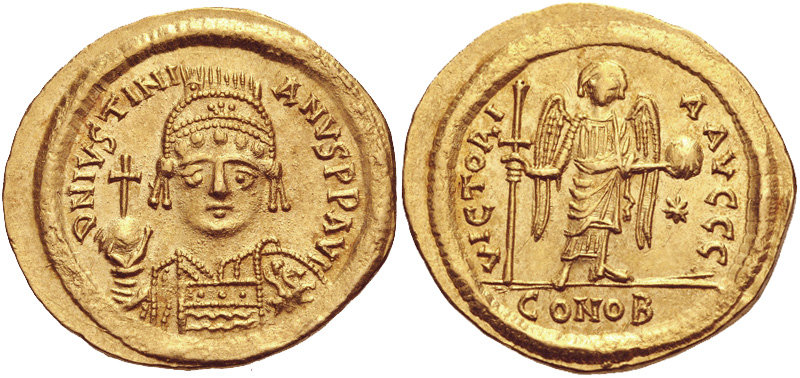
Solidus of Justinian I (r. 527–565)

Sergius came from a family in Dara, Mesopotamia. He was the middle son of the priest Bacchus, brother of the officers Cyrus and Solomon, and nephew of the famous general Solomon. He is first mentioned in 543 when he was appointed duke of Tripolitania (dux militis Tripolitanae provinciae) and raised to the rank of vir spectabilis; the sources state that he was still young at this time. He was visited in Leptis Magna, the seat of Tripolitania, by the Moorish tribe of the Laguatan, who sought the usual payment and assurances of peace. On the advice of Pudentius, he allowed only 80 tribal leaders to enter the city, with a promise that he would do what they asked. A banquet was offered to the Moors, and in it, the Berber leaders were massacred. One of them, however, managed to escape and warned his people of what had happened. A battle was fought near Leptis Magna and the Moors were defeated. Many of them were killed, their women and children enslaved, and their camps looted.

In 544, as the revolt was getting out of hand, Sergius set out for Carthage to seek reinforcements from his uncle Solomon. He accompanied Solomon, and his brothers Cyrus and Solomon in their march against the tribal leader Antalas. Sergius encamped with the others at Tébessa and presumably participated in the Battle of Cilium, in which the Byzantines were defeated and his uncle perished; according to the sources, Sergius left his brother Solomon to die. After his uncle's death, Sergius was appointed governor of Africa by the emperor Justinian I (r. 527–565), and he was granted civil and military powers. Sergius was likely appointed master of soldiers (magister militum vacans), a post he held at least until 559, and praetorian prefect of Africa (praefecti praetorio Africae), which he might have retained until 545 when Athanasius and Areobindus were sent to Africa.

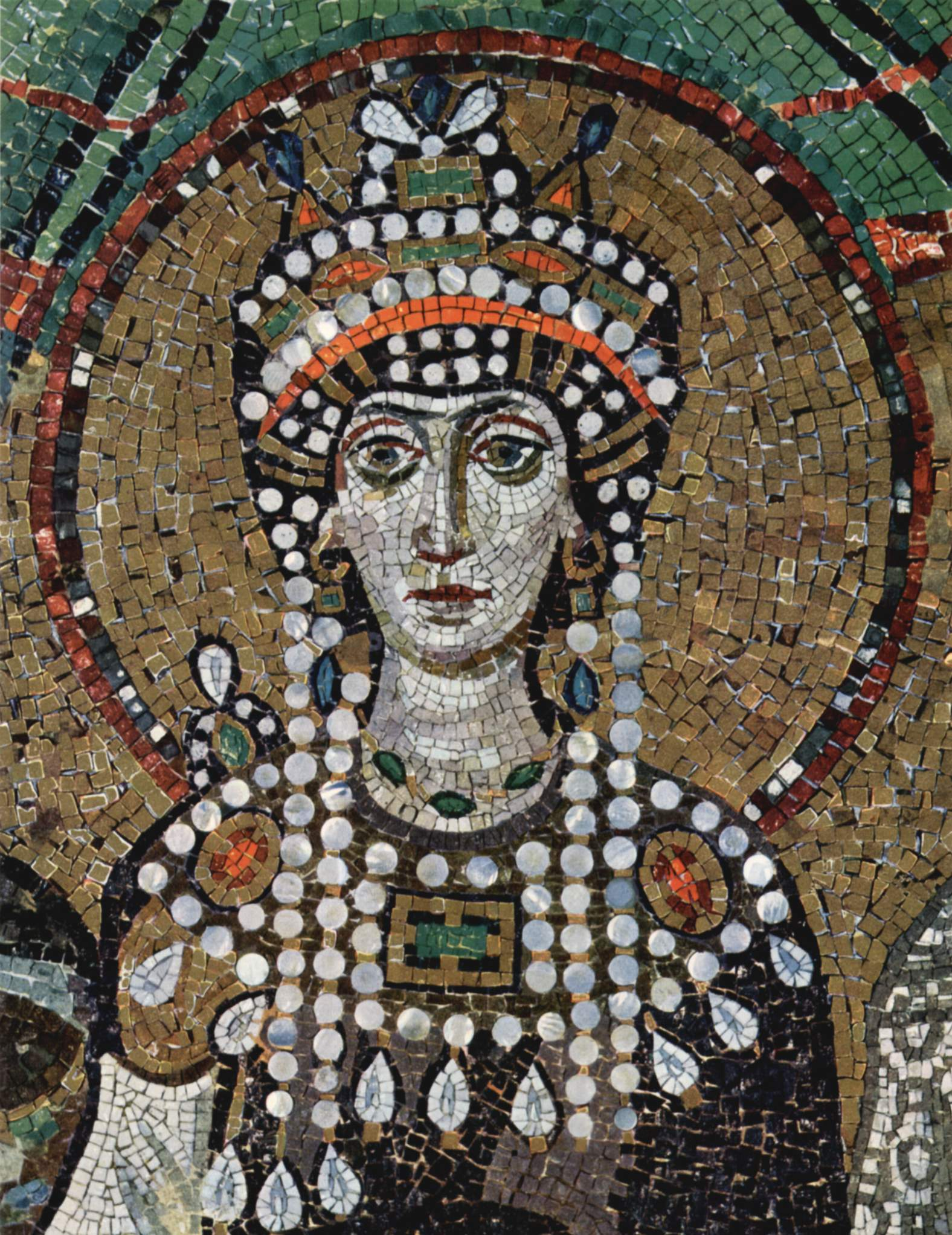
Theodora in detail of a mosaic from the Basilica of San Vitale

According to Procopius, his appointment as prefect of Africa was a disaster, as Sergius was more concerned about flaunting his money and power than actually managing the province. Furthermore, according to Procopius, during his tenure soldiers were alienated, among them officer John. Consequently, no measures were taken to stop the advance of the Moors commanded by Antalas, nor the rebels led by Stotzas. In a letter to Justinian, Antalas stated that he would cease hostilities if Sergius was dismissed and another general was sent, but the emperor did not comply with the request. According to what the sources reveal, at this point, the African army was so small that Father Paul of Hadrumetum was denied 80 men to recover his city.

Sergius's growing unpopularity in the province, and the routine raids by rebels and Moors, led to the flight of many abroad. Aware of this situation, Justinian sent to Africa the magister militum Areobindus, likely in the spring of 545, and the praetorian prefect Athanasius. Instead of being recalled, Sergius shared command with Areobindus, while his post as praetorian prefect was taken by Athanasius. Sergius was ordered to deal with the Moors of Numidia and Areobindus with those of Byzacena. Upon learning that Antalas and Stotzas were near El Kef (near the border with Numidia), Areobindus sent the aforementioned John to deal with them and wrote to Sergius requesting reinforcements. The request was not answered, which caused a heavy Byzantine defeat that resulted in John's death, although he was able to kill Stotzas. After this setback, Sergius was effectively recalled, and the command of Africa passed entirely to Areobindus; this occurred two months before the revolt of Guntarith that would end with Areobindus's death.

At the imperial court in Constantinople, Sergius won the appreciation of empress Theodora (r. 527–548), which freed him from any accusation of the mismanagement of Africa. In addition, he was one of the suitors of the granddaughter of Antonina, the wife of Belisarius. Later, probably in the fall of 547, he was sent together with the Iberian prince Pacurius with an army to Italy, in response to Belisarius' appeal.His activities in Italy were not recorded. He is last mentioned in 559 when he was a patrician. This year, when the Kutrigurs and Slavs invaded Thrace, Sergius was robbed and captured as a prisoner by Zabergan. Later the same year, he was released on payment of ransom.

== Bibliography ==
- Martindale, John R., ed. (1992). The Prosopography of the Later Roman Empire: Volume III, AD 527–641. Cambridge: Cambridge University Press. ISBN 0-521-20160-8.

Preceded by Solomon	Praetorian Prefect of Africa; 545–548/550	Succeeded by Athanasius
