= Boraides =

Boraides (Greek: Βοραΐδης, d. 548) was a cousin of the Byzantine emperor Justinian I (r. 527–565), better known for his role in ending the Nika riots of 532. The primary source about him is Procopius.

== Life ==
Boraides was a brother of Germanus and Justus. They were reportedly cousins of Justinian I, though the exact relation is uncertain. They were nephews of Justin I (r. 518–527), though often erroneously stated to be nephews of Justinian himself.

On the last day of the Nika riots, Boraides and Justus were responsible for capturing Hypatius, whom the populace had declared emperor, and his brother Pompeius. Procopius reports: "Then indeed from both sides the partisans of Hypatius were assailed with might and main and destroyed. When the rout had become complete and there had already been great slaughter of the populace, Boraides and Justus, nephews of the Emperor Justinian, without anyone daring to lift a hand against them, dragged Hypatius down from the throne, and, leading him in, handed him over together with Pompeius to the emperor."

Boraides died in 548, survived by a wife and daughter. His will left most of his estate to his brother Germanus and nephews Justin and Justinian. His daughter would only inherit the minimum required by the law. However Justinian I championed the cause of the daughter, and arranged the inheritance to favour her. This was perceived as a slight by Germanus, who for a time became alienated from Justinian. As a consequence, Germanus was approached by the disaffected Armenians Artabanes and Arsaces, who tried to persuade him to participate in a coup against Justinian. Germanus however revealed the plot to the comes excubitorum Marcellus, who in turn revealed it to Justinian.

== Sources ==
- Bury, John Bagnell (1958) [1923], History of the Later Roman Empire: From the Death of Theodosius I to the Death of Justinian, Volume 2, Mineola, New York: Dover Publications, OCLC 41478187
- Kazhdan, Alexander, ed. (1991), Oxford Dictionary of Byzantium, Oxford University Press, ISBN 978-0-19-504652-6
- Martindale, John R., ed. (1980). The Prosopography of the Later Roman Empire: Volume II, AD 395–527. Cambridge: Cambridge University Press. ISBN 0-521-20159-4.
- Martindale, John R., ed. (1992). The Prosopography of the Later Roman Empire: Volume III, AD 527–641. Cambridge: Cambridge University Press. ISBN 0-521-20160-8.
- Procopius of Caesarea; Dewing, Henry Bronson (1914), History of the wars. vol. 1, Books I-II, Cambridge University Press, ISBN 0-674-99054-4
