= Alexander (comes) =

Alexander (Greek: Αλέξανδρος), known by the title comes (Greek: ο κόμης), was a Byzantine diplomat. He was active in the reign of Justinian I (r. 527–565). The main sources about him are Procopius, John Malalas and Theophanes the Confessor.

== Biography ==
Alexander was reportedly a brother of Athanasius. His brother served as Praetorian Prefect of Italy (539-542) and Praetorian Prefect of Africa (545-548) Alexander is described as a member of the Byzantine Senate by Procopius. He probably held the rank of vir illustris ("illustrious man", high-ranking senator). Both John Malalas and Theophanes the Confessor list him as "Alexander the comes" (Greek: Αλέξανδρος ο κόμης).

=== Envoy to the Sassanids (530) ===
He is first mentioned in 530, among events following the Battle of Dara. He joined Rufinus as member of an embassy, one sent from Justinian I to Kavadh I of the Sassanid Empire. Procopius only names Rufinus, Alexander is named by Malalas and Theophanes. Procopius describes the meeting of 530 as following: "Rufinus, coming into the presence of Cabades, spoke as follows: "O King, I have been sent by thy brother [Justinian], who reproaches thee with a just reproach, because the Persians for no righteous cause have come in arms into his land. But it would be more seemly for a king who is not only mighty, but also wise as thou art, to secure a peaceful conclusion of war, rather than, when affairs have been satisfactorily settled, to inflict upon himself and his people unnecessary confusion. Wherefore also I myself have come here with good hopes, in order that from now on both peoples may enjoy the blessings which come from peace." So spoke Rufinus.

"And Cabades replied as follows: "O son of Silvanus, by no means try to reverse the causes, understanding as you do best of all men that you Romans have been the chief cause of the whole confusion. For we have taken the Caspian Gates to the advantage of both Persians and Romans, after forcing out the barbarians there, since Anastasius, the Emperor of the Romans, as you yourself doubtless know, when the opportunity was offered him to buy them with money, was not willing to do so, in order that he might not be compelled to squander great sums of money in behalf of both nations by keeping an army there perpetually. And since that time we have stationed that great army there, and have supported it up to the present time, thereby giving you the privilege of inhabiting the land unplundered as far as concerns the barbarians on that side, and of holding your own possessions with complete freedom from trouble. But as if this were not sufficient for you, you have also made a great city, Daras, as a stronghold against the Persians, although this was explicitly forbidden in the treaty which Anatolius arranged with the Persians; and as a result of this it is necessary for the Persian state to be afflicted with the difficulties and the expense of two armies, the one in order that the Massagetae (Huns) may not be able fearlessly to plunder the land of both of us, and the other in order that we may check your inroads. When lately we made a protest regarding these matters and demanded that one of two things should be done by you, either that the army sent to the Caspian Gates should be sent by both of us, or that the city of Daras should be dismantled, you refused to understand what was said, but saw fit to strengthen your plot against the Persians by a greater injury, if we remember correctly the building of the fort in Mindouos. And even now the Romans may choose peace, or they may elect war, by either doing justice to us or going against our rights. For never will the Persians lay down their arms, until the Romans either help them in guarding the gates, as is just and right, or dismantle the city of Daras." With these words Cabades dismissed the ambassador, dropping the hint that he was willing to take money from the Romans and have done with the causes of the war."

=== Envoy to the Sassanids (531) ===
The Byzantine envoys had returned to Justinian by September, 530. In late 531, Alexander was one of four envoys sent to new king Khosrau I (r. 531–579), successor to Kavadh. The other three were Hermogenes, Rufinus and Thomas. The negotiations are described in detail by Procopius. Khosrau's term for a peace treaty were relatively harsh. The headquarters of the Byzantine army in Mesopotamia would move from Dara to Constantina, the Sassanids would keep all fortresses in Lazica, the Byzantines would cede to him Pharangium and Bolum (their last two strongholds in the area), along with a payment in gold.

"The ambassadors, while approving the rest, said that they were not able to concede the fortresses, unless they should first make enquiry of the emperor concerning them. It was decided, accordingly, that Rufinus should be sent concerning them to Byzantium, and that the others should wait until he should return. And it was arranged with Rufinus that seventy days' time be allowed until he should arrive. When Rufinus reached Byzantium and reported to the emperor what Chosroes' decision was concerning the peace, the emperor commanded that the peace be concluded by them on these terms."

While Khosrau and the Byzantine envoys were waiting for the return of Rufinus, a rumour nearly started a new phase of the war. It reported that Justinian had cancelled the negotiations and executed Rufinus as a traitor. Khosrau was enraged and once again led his army on campaign. But he met with an alive Rufinus in the vicinity of Nisibis. Rufinus had with him the money necessary to conclude the treaty. But Justinian had changed his mind. A last minute order caused the collapse of negotiations. Khosrau could have held the money or proceed with his campaign. But Rufinous persuaded the new monarch to return the money and postpone hostilities. The envoys and the money safely returned to Dara.

Alexander and the others came to distrust Rufinus, noting that Khosrau was treating him as one of his own advisors. Then indeed the fellow-ambassadors of Rufinus began to regard him with extreme suspicion themselves, and they also denounced him to the emperor, basing their judgment on the fact that Chosroes had been persuaded to concede him everything which he asked of him. However, the emperor showed him no disfavour on account of this."

=== Envoy to the Ostrogoths (534) ===
Alexander resurfaces in 534 as an envoy to Athalaric and Amalasuntha. The former was the king of the Ostrogoths, the latter his mother and regent. The official causes of his visit was to present with three specific complaints. The first was about the occupation of Lilybaeum, Sicily by the Goths. The second was that a number of Huns, deserters from the Byzantine army, had found refuge in Campania. They even gained the protection of Uliaris, governor of Naples. The third was that in the conflict between the Ostrogoths and the Gepids, the Byzantine town of Gratiana in Illyricum was treated as hostile by the Goths.

Procopius claims that Alexander was carrying a secret mission as well. He was to learn more about Amalasuntha's plans to flee the Italian Peninsula and seek refuge at Constantinople. Amalasuntha's ship had been stationed at Epidamnus for some time but the regent had yet to act. Alexander first stopped in Rome to join with the bishops Demetrius and Hypatius. They were the eByzantine envoys sent in 533 and had yet to return. All three arrived in Ravenna to meet the regent.

Amalasuntha dismissed Justinian's complaints as trivial: "One may reasonably expect an emperor who is great and lays claim to virtue to assist an orphan child [Athalaric] who does not in the least comprehend what is being done, rather than for no cause at all to quarrel with him. For unless a struggle be waged on even terms, even the victory it gains brings no honour. But thou dost threaten Atalaric on account of Lilybaeum, and ten runaways, and a mistake, made by soldiers in going against their enemies, which through some misapprehension chanced to affect a friendly city." But she secretly agreed "to put the whole of Italy into his hands". Alexander returned with both replies, setting the stage for the Gothic War (535-554). He is not mentioned again.

== Sources ==
- Martindale, John R.; Jones, A.H.M.; Morris, John (1992), The Prosopography of the Later Roman Empire, Volume III: AD 527–641, Cambridge University Press, ISBN 0-521-20160-8
- Procopius of Caesarea; Dewing, Henry Bronson (1914), History of the wars. vol. 1, Books I-II, Cambridge University Press, ISBN 0-674-99054-4
- Procopius of Caesarea; Dewing, Henry Bronson (1914), History of the wars. vol. 3, Books V-VI, Cambridge University Press, ISBN 0-674-99054-4
