= Athanasius (praetorian prefect) =

Athanasius (Greek: Ἀθανάσιος) was a 6th-century Byzantine official who served as envoy and praetorian prefect of Italy and Africa under Emperor Justinian I (r. 527–565).

Nothing is known of Athanasius's origins or early life. The historian Procopius of Caesarea and the African poet Corippus record only that by 545 he was elderly. Two members of Athanasius's family are known: his brother, the comes and senator Alexander, who led embassies to Sassanid Persia and Ostrogothic Italy in the early 530s, and his son-in-law Leontius, who led an embassy to the Franks in 551.

Athanasius first appears in 536, when he was sent to Italy alongside Peter the Patrician to accept the surrender of Gothic forces, as Peter and the Ostrogothic king, Theodahad, had agreed in previous embassies. Theodahad, however, upon learning of Byzantine reversals in Dalmatia and of the death there of the general Mundus in battle with Gothic forces, took heart and resolved to resist the Byzantine attack. The two Byzantine envoys were arrested, while the war recommenced. They remained imprisoned in Ravenna for three years, until released in June/July 539 by the new Gothic king, Witigis, in exchange for Gothic envoys sent to Persia who had been captured by the Byzantines. On their arrival in Constantinople, Emperor Justinian rewarded them both with high office, appointing Peter as his magister officiorum and Athanasius as praetorian prefect of Italy. Athanasius arrived again in Italy in the early spring of 540, but little is known of his tenure, except that he accompanied the commanders dispersed by Belisarius around Italy, perhaps to organize their supplies. Athanasius probably held the post until summer/autumn 542, when replaced by Maximinus, but seems to have remained in Italy as late as 544.

In early 545, shortly after his return from Italy, Emperor Justinian dispatched Athanasius as praetorian prefect to Africa, alongside the aged senator Areobindus, who was named as the province's new magister militum. Areobindus soon faced a military revolt led by the dux Numidiae, Guntharic. In March 546, Guntharic seized Carthage and imprisoned Athanasius and Areobindus. When summoned before the rebel, Athanasius presented himself as his supporter and took care to flatter Guntharic. This, and his advanced age, may have saved him later, when Areobindus was murdered during a dinner in the palace. According to Corippus, Athanasius then masterminded the palace coup that murdered Guntharic and restored Byzantine imperial control over Africa a few months later: the Armenian officer Artabanes murdered the rebel at a banquet. Although Procopius does not mention Athanasius's role, according to the authors of the PLRE this is likely because Artabanes, or one of his close associates, was Procopius's source for the episode. At any rate, after Guntharic's death, Athanasius moved quickly to secure control of his treasury. Athanasius continued in office and was instrumental in the reorganization of the Byzantine forces under John Troglita in the winter of 547/548, following the disastrous defeat at the Battle of Marta. He was still in office circa 550, but he was replaced at the latest by September 552.

Nothing further is known of him, although he may be the same as the senator Athanasius who was sent to Lazica in 556 to investigate the murder of king Gubazes II by the Byzantine generals stationed there, and to examine the accusations of treason levelled by the latter against Gubazes.

== Sources ==
- Bury, John Bagnell (1958) [1923]. History of the Later Roman Empire: From the Death of Theodosius I to the Death of Justinian, Volume 2. Mineola, New York: Dover Publications. OCLC 41478187.
- Martindale, John R., ed. (1992). The Prosopography of the Later Roman Empire: Volume III, AD 527–641. Cambridge: Cambridge University Press. ISBN 0-521-20160-8.
