= Artabanes =

Byzantine general

- Relatives: Arsaces
- Military career
- Allegiance: Byzantine Empire; Sassanian Empire (briefly)
- Rank: magister militum
- Conflicts: Moorish revolt (544–548); Gothic War (535–554); Casilinum

Artabanes (Greek: Ἀρταβάνης, Armenian: Արտաւան Artawan, from Parthian Artawân, fl. 538–554) was a Byzantine general of Armenian origin who served under Justinian I (r. 527–565). Initially a rebel against Byzantine authority, he fled to the Sassanid Persians but soon returned to Byzantine allegiance. He served in Africa, where he won great fame by killing the rebel general Guntharic and restoring the province to imperial allegiance. He became engaged to Justinian's niece Praejecta, but did not marry her due to the opposition of the Empress Theodora. Recalled to Constantinople, he became involved in a failed conspiracy against Justinian in 548/549, but wasn't punished severely after its revelation. He was soon pardoned and sent to Italy to fight in the Gothic War, where he participated in the decisive Byzantine victory at Casilinum.

== Early life ==
Artabanes was a descendant of the royal Armenian Arsacid line, a branch of which at the time was recognized as autonomous local princes in the eastern fringes of the Byzantine Empire. His father was named John, and he had a brother also named John.

=== Revolt against Byzantium ===
In 538/539, Artabanes, at the time apparently still a young man, took part in the Armenian conspiracy against Acacius, the proconsul of First Armenia, whose heavy taxes and cruel behaviour was greatly resented. Artabanes himself killed Acacius. Shortly after, in a skirmish between the rebels and the Byzantine army at Oenochalacon, Artabanes may have killed the Byzantine general Sittas, sent by Justinian to quell the rebellion (Procopius supplies two accounts, one attributing Sittas's death to Artabanes and another to an otherwise unknown Armenian named Solomon). Artabanes's father tried to negotiate a settlement with Sittas' successor, Bouzes, but was murdered by the latter. This act forced Artabanes and his followers to seek the aid of the Sassanid Persian ruler, Khosrau I (r. 531–579). Crossing over to Persian territory, over the next few years Artabanes and those who followed him took part in Khosrau's campaigns against the Byzantines.

== Service in Africa ==
At some time around 544, perhaps as early as 542, Artabanes, his brother John and several other Armenians deserted back to the Byzantines.

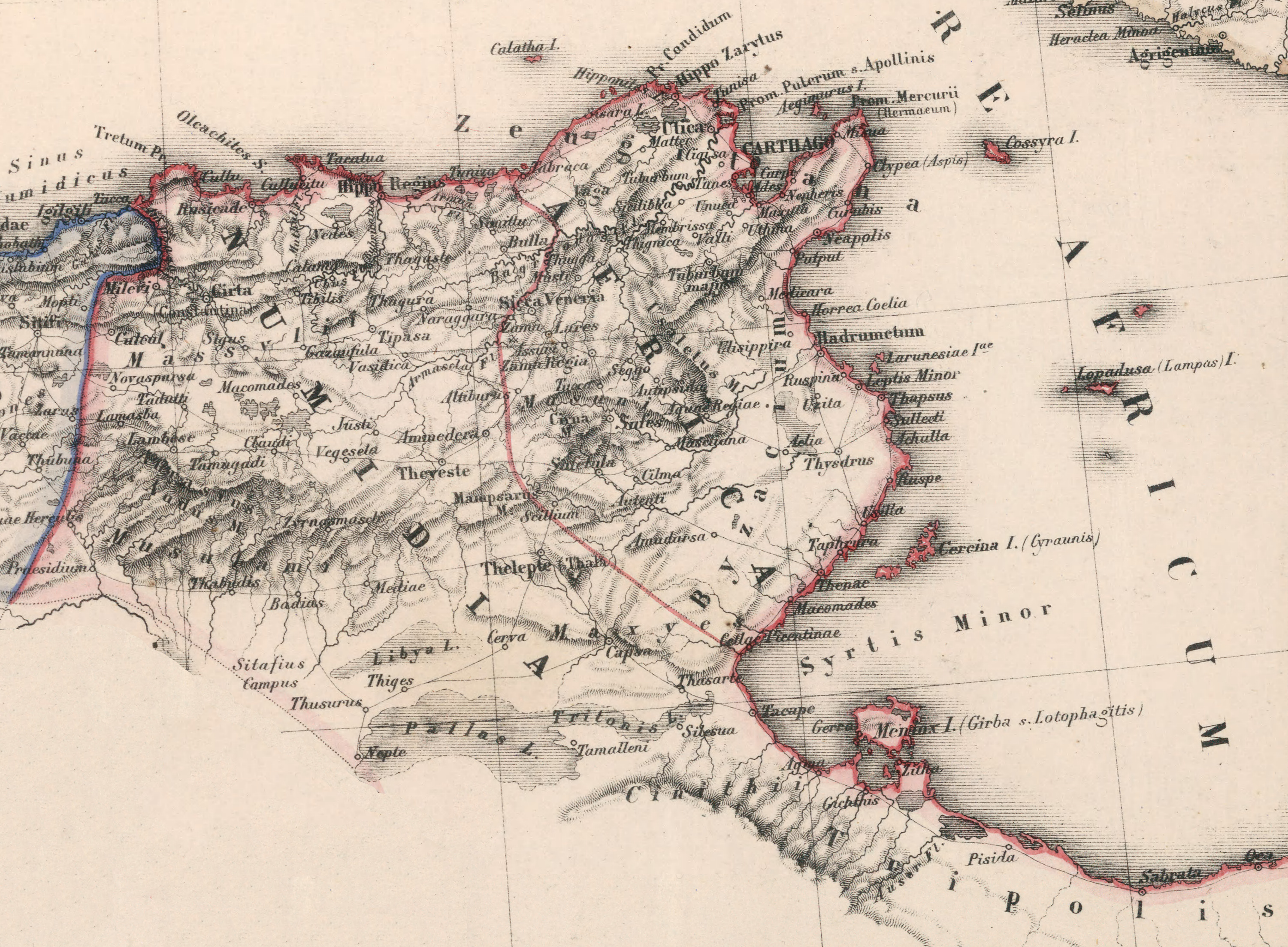
Africa, with the provinces of Byzacena, Zeugitana and Numidia.

Along with his brother, Artabanes was placed in command of a small Armenian contingent and sent to Africa in spring 545 under the senator Areobindus. There, the Byzantines were engaged in a protracted war with the rebellious Moorish tribes. Shortly after their arrival, John died in battle at Sicca Veneria with the rebel forces of the renegade Stotzas. Artabanes and his men remained loyal to Areobindus during the rebellion of the dux Numidiae Guntharic in late 545. Guntharic, allied with the Moorish chieftain Antalas, marched on Carthage and seized the city gates. At the urging of Artabanes and others, Areobindus decided to confront the rebel. The two armies appeared evenly matched, until Areobindus took fright and fled to a monastery seeking sanctuary. Thereupon the troops loyal to him also fled, and the city fell to Guntharic.

Areobindus was murdered by Guntharic, but Artabanes secured guarantees of his safety and pledged himself to Guntharic's service. In secret, however, he began planning to overthrow him. Soon after, Artabanes was entrusted, alongside John and Ulitheus, with an expedition against Antalas's Moors. He marched south, along with an allied Moorish contingent under Cutzinas. Antalas's men fled before him, but Artabanes did not pursue them and turned back. According to Procopius, he considered leading his men to join the loyalist imperial garrison that held out at Hadrumetum under Marcentius, but decided to return to Carthage and go on with his plan to assassinate Guntharic. Artabanes kept his plan in absolute secrecy for a long time, confiding only with his two closest Armenian friends: even his Armenian unit of hand-picked and completely loyal veteran soldiers was not aware of it until the very last moment. Such a perfect concealment was achieved, not least thanks to the fact that during both planning and implementation stages of this assassination the communication between the exclusively Armenian conspirators was in their mother tongue, an incomprehensible language for other ethnic elements of the imperial army in Africa.

Upon his return to Carthage, he justified his decision to turn back by insisting that the entire army was needed to quell the insurgents, and urged Guntharic to set forth himself. At the same time, he conspired with his nephew, Gregory, and a few other of his Armenian bodyguards to murder the usurper (although Corippus suggests that it was the praetorian prefect Athanasius who was the real mastermind of the plot). On the eve of the army's departure in early May, Guntharic hosted a great banquet, and invited Artabanes and Athanasius to share the same couch, a mark of honour. Suddenly, during the banquet, Artabanes' Armenians fell upon Guntharic's bodyguards, while Artabanes himself allegedly landed the killing blow on Guntharic.

This deed won him great honour and fame: Praejecta, the widow of Areobindus and niece of Justinian, whom Guntharic was planning to marry, gave him a rich reward, while the emperor confirmed him as magister militum of Africa. Despite being already married to a relative of his, Artabanes eventually became engaged with Praejecta. He sent her back to Constantinople and himself asked from Justinian to be recalled from Africa, so that they could marry.

== Artabanes at Constantinople and the conspiracy against Justinian ==
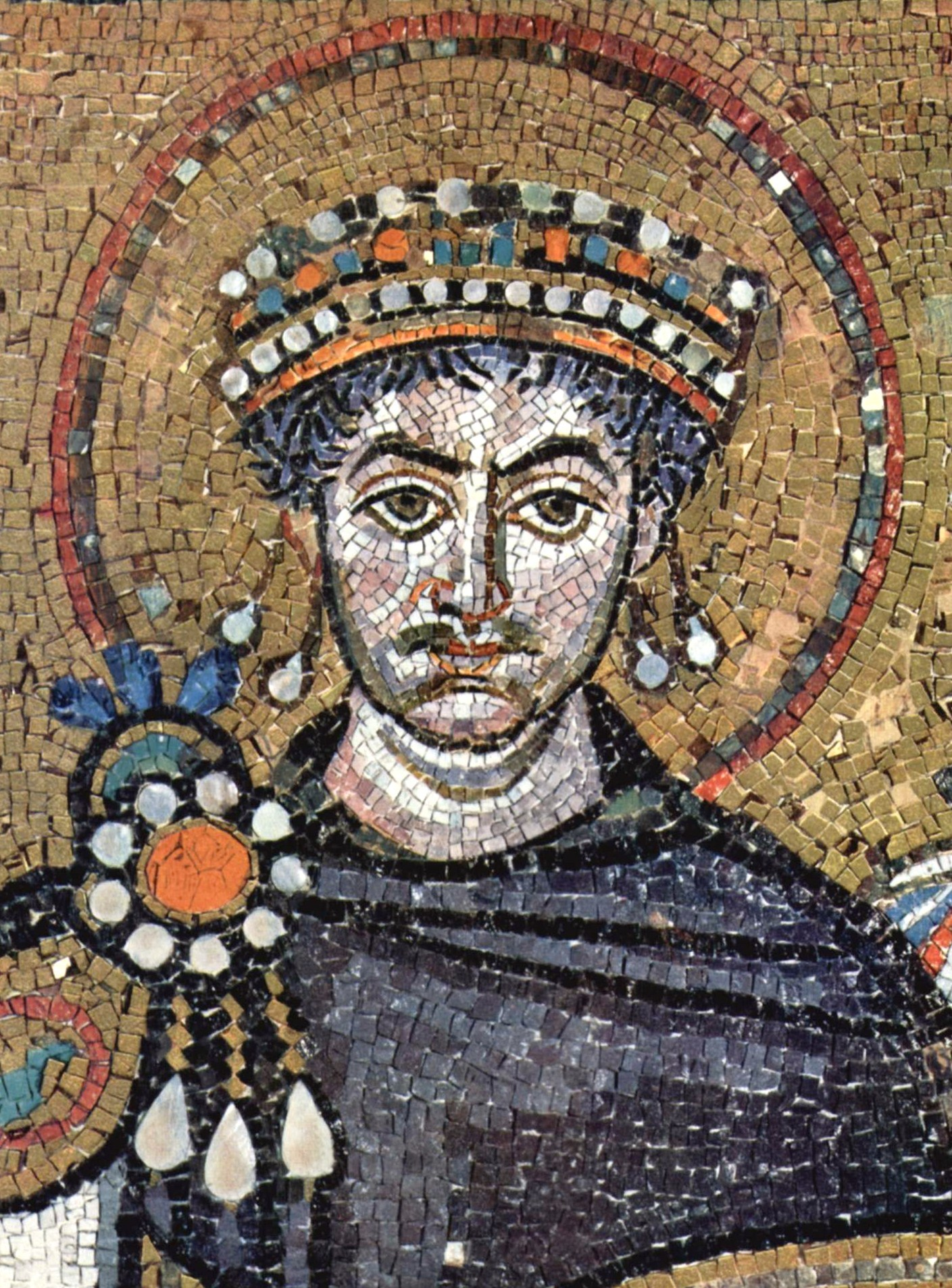
Emperor Justinian I (r. 527–565).

Soon afterwards, Artabanes was indeed recalled to Constantinople, replaced in Africa by John Troglita. He received numerous honours from Justinian, and was named magister militum praesentalis, comes foederatorum and honorary consul. Despite these and his great popularity however, he was unable to achieve his ambition of marrying Praejecta: his wife came to the imperial capital and presented her case to the Empress Theodora. The Empress compelled Artabanes to retain his wife, and not until after Theodora's death in 548 was the Armenian general able to divorce himself. By then, however, Praejecta had already been remarried.

Irritated over this affair, shortly after Theodora's death (late 548/early 549) he became involved in the so-called "Armenian Plot" or "Conspiracy of Artabanes". The real instigator, however, was a relative of his, named Arsaces, who proposed to assassinate Justinian, and elevate Justinian's cousin Germanus on the throne instead. The conspirators thought Germanus amenable to their plans, since he had been dissatisfied with Justinian's meddling in the settling of the will of his recently deceased brother Boraides, which had initially named Germanus as the major beneficiary as opposed to the former's sole daughter. The conspirators approached Germanus's son Justin first, and revealed to him the plot. Immediately, he informed his father, and he in turn informed the comes excubitorum Marcellus. In order to find out more of their intentions, Germanus met the conspirators in person, while a trusted aide of Marcellus was concealed nearby and listened in. Although Marcellus hesitated to inform Justinian without further proof, eventually he revealed the conspiracy to the emperor. Justinian ordered the conspirators imprisoned and questioned, but they were otherwise treated remarkably leniently. Artabanes was stripped of his offices and confined to the palace under guard, but was soon pardoned.

== Service in Italy ==
In 550, Artabanes was appointed magister militum per Thracias and sent to replace the aged senator Liberius in command of an expedition under way against Sicily, which had recently been overrun by the Ostrogoth king Totila. Artabanes failed to catch up with the expedition before it sailed for Sicily, and his own fleet was driven back and scattered by severe storms in the Ionian Sea. Eventually he arrived in Sicily and took command of the Byzantine forces there. He besieged the Gothic garrisons left behind by Totila after he left the island and soon forced them to surrender. Over the next two years, he remained in Sicily. According to Procopius, the inhabitants of the mainland city of Croton, which was being besieged by the Goths, repeatedly sent to him for help, but he did nothing.

In 553, he crossed over into mainland Italy, where he joined the army of Narses as one of its generals. Facing the Frankish invasion in the summer of 553, Narses ordered Artabanes and other generals to occupy the passes of the Apennines and harass the enemy advance; after a Byzantine contingent was defeated at Parma, however, the other Byzantine generals withdrew to Faventia, until an envoy from Narses persuaded them to move up to the area of Parma again. In 554, Artabanes was stationed at Pisaurum with Byzantine and Hunnic troops. At Fanum, he ambushed and defeated the advance guard of the Frankish army of Leutharis, which was returning from a plundering expedition into southern Italy and heading back to Gaul. Most of the Franks fell, and in the confusion, the many captives escaped, taking much of the Franks' booty with them. Artabanes did not engage the main body of Leutharis' army however, since it far outnumbered his own force. He then marched south and joined Narses's main force, accompanying him in his campaign against the remaining Frankish army under Butilinus. At the decisive Byzantine victory in the Battle of Casilinum, along with Valerian, he commanded the cavalry in the Byzantine left flank. They were concealed in the woods, as part of Narses's stratagem to attack the Franks in the rear and encircle them. Nothing further is known of him after that.

== Sources ==
- Ayvazyan, Armen (2012). The Armenian Military in the Byzantine Empire: Conflict and Alliance under Justinian and Maurice. Alfortville: Sigest. ISBN 978-2-9173-2939-9. Archived from the original on 2019-02-10.
- Bury, John Bagnell (1958) [1923]. History of the Later Roman Empire: From the Death of Theodosius I to the Death of Justinian, Volume 2. Mineola, New York: Dover Publications. OCLC 41478187.
- Martindale, John R., ed. (1992). The Prosopography of the Later Roman Empire: Volume III, AD 527–641. Cambridge: Cambridge University Press. ISBN 0-521-20160-8.
