= Marcellus (comes excubitorum) =

Marcellus (Greek: Μάρκελλος) was an Eastern Roman judicial official, one of the closest aides of the Byzantine emperor Justinian I (r. 527–565) and commander of the imperial bodyguard of the excubitores in circa 541–552.

== Biography ==
Nothing is known of his early life and career, but he was evidently an experienced judge, for on April 8, 539 Emperor Justinian appointed him as one of the four senior judges (iudices pedanei). It is possible that he was one of the comites consistoriani, since he is referred to as comes in 540. In the Novel concerning his appointment, he is recorded by Emperor Justinian as being a close associate and "famous for his concern for justice", while the historian Procopius of Caesarea describes him as very austere, incorruptible, and a forbidding personality, with a profound concern for justice and truth.

By early 541, Marcellus had been appointed to the very influential post of comes excubitorum, head of the imperial and palace guard.

=== Downfall of John the Cappadocian ===
In May 541, he was involved in a plot by the Empress Theodora and her close friend Antonina, directed against Emperor Justinian's powerful but widely disliked praetorian prefect, John the Cappadocian. John had grown exceedingly powerful, surrounding himself with thousands of armed retainers. Theodora resented his influence over Emperor Justinian, while John hated the popular general Belisarius, Antonina's husband.

Between them, Theodora and Antonina contrived a plan to make the prefect confess to treasonous intentions: using his daughter as an intermediary, Antonina confided that Belisarius was considering a coup, and asked for John's assistance. A meeting was arranged at the palace of Rufinianae near Chalcedon, where Marcellus, along with the eunuch praepositus sacri cubiculi Narses and many soldiers were in attendance to witness the events. Marcellus and Narses were ordered by Theodora to kill John if he spoke out in favor of treason. In the ensuing scuffle, however, John escaped and fled to a church, while Marcellus was wounded by one of John's guards. John was removed from office immediately after and was banished to Cyzicus.

=== Conspiracy of Artabanes ===
Marcellus resurfaces in late 548 or early 549, when he became involved in the conspiracy of the Armenian magister militum praesentalis Artabanes.

Artabanes had felt slighted when the Empress Theodora had blocked his marriage with Emperor Justinian's niece Praejecta in 546 on the grounds of an existing marriage. Together with a few of his kinsmen, he plotted to murder Emperor Justinian and Belisarius and install his cousin Germanus as Byzantine emperor. To this end, they contacted Germanus's eldest son, Justin. Justin pretended to be sympathetic to the plot, but reported it back to is father, who in turn notified Marcellus. Marcellus was initially reluctant to accuse Artabanes without more proof, and arranged for another discussion between the plotters and Justin to be held, overheard by his concealed associate Leontius. Even then, however, out of sympathy for Artabanes, he hesitated to inform Emperor Justinian, but also dissuaded Germanus from contacting the Byzantine emperor directly, as this might alert the conspirators. In the end, however, as Belisarius was returning to the city and the time for the plot to be implemented came near, he revealed it to the Byzantine emperor.

Emperor Justinian was enraged that the matter had been concealed from him for so long, but Marcellus took all the blame upon himself. Artabanes and his co-conspirators were only lightly punished; Artabanes himself was only confined to house arrest, but pardoned soon after and sent as general in Sicily. When the matter was examined by the consistorium, suspicions also fell on Germanus and his sons, but Marcellus's testimony cleared them.

In January 552, Marcellus is recorded as having been awarded the title of honorary consul, and under the title of "judge" (gloriosus iudes) in an embassy to Pope Vigilius, indicating his possible dismissal from the post of comes excubitorum. Nothing further is known of him.

== Sources ==
- Bury, John Bagnell (1923) [1889]. History of the Later Roman Empire: From Arcadius to Irene (395 A.D. to 800 A.D.). Vol. II. New York, New York and London, United Kingdom: Macmillan & Company Limited.
- Martindale, John Robert; Jones, Arnold Hugh Martin; Morris, J., eds. (1992). The Prosopography of the Later Roman Empire, Volume III: A.D. 527–641. Cambridge, United Kingdom: Cambridge University Press. ISBN 978-0-521-20160-5.
