= Germanus (cousin of Justinian I) =

Byzantine general (died 550)

- Died: 550; Serdica
- Spouses: Passara; Matasuintha
- Children: Justin; Justinian; Justina; Germanus
- Relatives: Justinian I (cousin); Boraides and Justus (brothers); John (son-in-law)
- Military career
- Allegiance: Byzantine Empire
- Rank: magister militum

Germanus (Greek: Γερμανός; died 550) was an Eastern Roman general, one of the leading commanders of Emperor Justinian I (r. 527–565). Germanus was Emperor Justinian's cousin, thus also a member of the ruling dynasty. He held commands in Thrace, North Africa, and the East against Persia, and was slated to command the final Byzantine expedition against the Ostrogoths. Having married into the Gothic Amal royal line through his second wife Matasuntha and a distinguished service record, at the time of his sudden death, he was considered the probable heir to Emperor Justinian.

== Biography ==
=== Origins and early career ===
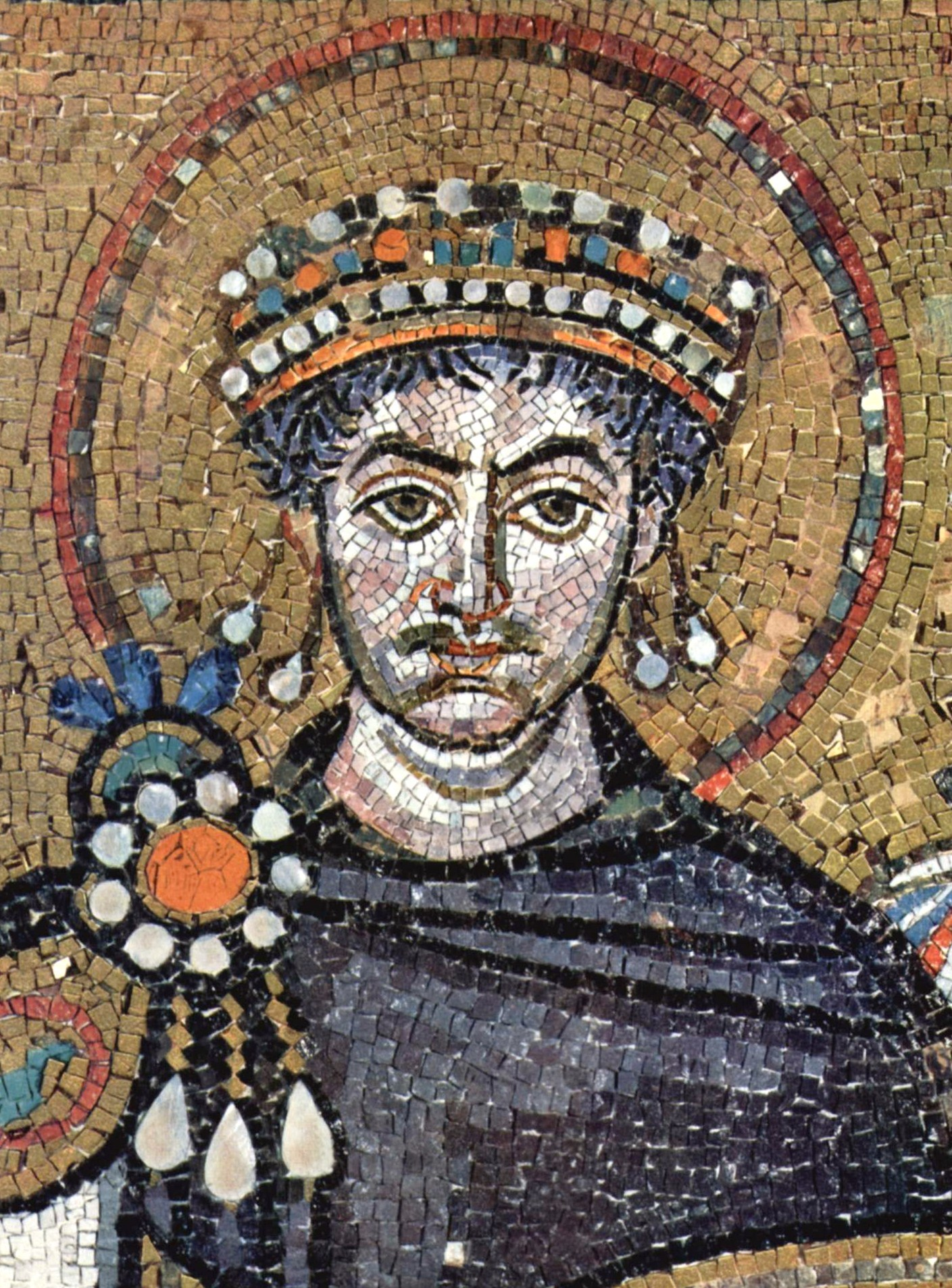
The Emperor Justinian I (r. 527–565).

Germanus was born before 505, the nephew of Emperor Justin I (r. 518–527) and thus cousin of Emperor Justinian I (r. 527–565), and not his nephew, as is often erroneously stated. According to a statement in Jordanes's Getica, Germanus was a descendant of the noble Roman clan of the Anicii. The exact nature of his connection, however, if indeed it is anything more than a literary device to indicate noble descent, is unclear. Theodor Mommsen hypothesized that his mother could have been a daughter of Anicia Juliana. During the reign of Emperor Justin I, he was raised to high office (he is recorded as a vir illustris in a 519 letter addressed to him by Pope Hormisdas), eventually being appointed as magister militum per Thraciae. In this capacity, he scored a crushing victory over an invasion of the Antae.

By 536, he was raised to the honorary consulate and the rank of patricius, and held the post of magister militum praesentalis. In that year, he was sent to North Africa to succeed Solomon as military commander, with the task of suppressing a large-scale mutiny of the Byzantine troops led by Stotzas. His tenure there, described by Procopius, was a thorough success. By appearing conciliatory and paying the arrears, he won over a large part of the mutinous army. He then defeated the remaining rebels under Stotzas at the Battle of Scalas Veteres in the spring of 537 and stabilized the situation by suppressing another conspiracy amongst his troops (cf. Maximinus) and restoring discipline.

Germanus was recalled by Emperor Justinian in 539, and sent to Antioch in 540 at the outbreak of the Lazic War with Sassanid Persia. Heavily outnumbered by the Persians, he retreated to Cilicia and was unable to prevent the catastrophic sack of Antioch in the same year. In the next year, as Belisarius assumed command in the East, Germanus returned to Constantinople.

=== Conspiracy of Artabanes ===
By 548, he was acknowledged as the most influential of Emperor Justinian's relatives and his heir apparent, although this was never formally recognized. In that year, his position was strengthened further by the death of Empress Theodora, who disliked him intensely. His stature at court was such that a plot was hatched by the disaffected general Artabanes and his kinsman Arsaces to assassinate Emperor Justinian and replace him with Germanus. The conspirators thought Germanus amenable to their plans, since he had been dissatisfied with Emperor Justinian's meddling in the settling of the will of his recently deceased brother Boraides.

The conspirators first told Justin, Germanus's eldest son, of their intentions. He, in turn, informed his father, who then held counsel with the comes excubitorum, Marcellus. In order to find out more of their intentions, Germanus met the conspirators in person, while a trusted aide of Marcellus, named Leontius, was concealed nearby and listened in. Marcellus then informed Emperor Justinian, and the conspirators were arrested, but treated with remarkable leniency. At first, Germanus and his sons too were suspected, until the testimony of Marcellus and the commanders Constantianus and Bouzes cleared them.

=== High command and death ===
In the meantime, the Gothic War in Italy against the Ostrogoths had been going badly for the Byzantine Empire, with the Gothic king Totila having wrested most of the peninsula back from the Byzantine troops. In 549, Emperor Justinian decided to send a major expeditionary force to Italy with Germanus as its head. Soon, however, he changed his mind and appointed the patricius Liberius instead, before cancelling the expedition altogether.

In 550, however, Emperor Justinian did finally appoint Germanus as commander-in-chief of an Italian expedition. Installing his base at Serdica (modern Sofia, Bulgaria), he began assembling an army. According to Procopius, his fame was such that soldiers, both Byzantines and barbarians, flocked to his banner. Even a Slav invasion headed for Thessalonica allegedly diverted itself towards Dalmatia at the news of his taking up command in Thrace. Germanus also took a step that he hoped would significantly decrease the resistance he would face from the Ostrogoths: he took as his second wife Matasuntha, the former queen of the Goths, granddaughter of Theodoric the Great and last surviving heir of the royal Amal line. Contemporary accounts certainly suggest that this move, combined with news of the massive preparations, produced an effect among the Goths in Italy, as well as the numerous Byzantine defectors in their ranks, some of whom sent messages promising to return to Byzantine allegiance upon his arrival.

In addition, this marriage, which was endorsed by Emperor Justinian himself, marked Germanus out as the heir to both the East Roman and the Gothic realms. It was not to be, however: only two days before the army was to set out, in the early autumn of 550, he fell ill and died. His demise dashed any hopes for the reconciliation of Goth and Roman in Italy, and led to further years of bloodshed, until the peninsula was definitively conquered by the Byzantines.

Germanus is given a very favourable treatment in the work of Procopius, he openly praises him for his virtue, justice, and generosity, as well as for his energy and ability both as a soldier and an administrator.

=== Family ===
Germanus had a brother named Boraides and perhaps also a brother named Justus. From his first marriage to a woman named Passara, he had two sons and a daughter:

- Justin, born probably in circa 525/530, became consul in 540 and general towards the end of Emperor Justinian's reign.
- Justinian, general.
- Justina, born in circa 527, who married in 545 the general John, nephew of the general and rebel Vitalian.

From his later marriage to Matasuntha, he had a son, also called Germanus, born posthumously (late 550/early 551). Nothing further is known of him with certainty, although he can possibly be identified with the patricius Germanus, a leading senator in the reign of Emperor Maurice (r. 582–602) whose daughter married Maurice's eldest son Theodosius. Michael Whitby identifies the younger Germanus with the caesar Germanus, a son-in-law of Tiberius II Constantine and Ino Anastasia.

== Sources ==
- Bury, John Bagnell (1958) [1923]. History of the Later Roman Empire: From the Death of Theodosius I to the Death of Justinian, Volume 2. Mineola, New York: Dover Publications. OCLC 41478187.
- Kazhdan, Alexander, ed. (1991). The Oxford Dictionary of Byzantium. Oxford and New York: Oxford University Press. ISBN 0-19-504652-8.
- Martindale, John R., ed. (1980). The Prosopography of the Later Roman Empire: Volume II, AD 395–527. Cambridge: Cambridge University Press. ISBN 0-521-20159-4.
- Martindale, John R., ed. (1992). The Prosopography of the Later Roman Empire: Volume III, AD 527–641. Cambridge: Cambridge University Press. ISBN 0-521-20160-8.
- Whitby, Michael (1988). The Emperor Maurice and his Historian: Theophylact Simocatta on Persian and Balkan Warfare. Oxford, United Kingdom: Oxford University Press. ISBN 0-19-822945-3.
