= James Allan Stewart Evans =

Canadian historian (1931–2023)

- Born: March 24, 1931; Cambridge, Ontario, Canada
- Died: November 15, 2023 (aged 92); Victoria, British Columbia, Canada
- Other name: J.A.S. Evans
- Education: Victoria College, Toronto, B.A., 1952; Yale University, M.A., 1953, Ph.D., 1957; also attended American School of Classical Studies, Athens, Greece, 1954-55.
- Occupations: historian and academic emeritus
- Notable work: Economic History of an Egyptian Temple in Greco-Roman Egypt, Yale University Press (New Haven, CT), 1961.; Procopius, Twayne (Boston, MA), 1972.; Polis and Imperium: Studies in Honour of Edward Togo Salmon, Hakkert (Toronto, Ontario, Canada), 1974.; Herodotus, Twayne (Boston, MA), 1982.; Herodotus, Explorer of the Past: Three Essays, Princeton University Press (Princeton, NJ), 1991.; The Age of Justinian: The Circumstances of Imperial Power, Routledge (New York, NY), 1996.; The Empress Theodora: Partner of Justinian, University of Texas Press (Austin, TX), 2002.; The Emperor Justinian and the Byzantine Empire, Greenwood Press (Westport, CT), 2005.; Daily Life in the Hellenistic Age: From Alexander to Cleopatra, Greenwood Press (Westport, CT), 2008.
- Spouse(s): Eleanor Lynn Ward, June 16, 1964;
- Children: 3
- Parents: David Arthur, a farmer (father); Isabella Jane Evans (mother)

James Allan Stewart Evans (March 24, 1931 – November 15, 2023) was a Canadian historian and professor emeritus of classical Near Eastern and religious studies.

== Biography ==
From 1955 to 1960 he was assistant professor of Classics at the University of Western Ontario and Waterloo College, London. From 1960 to 1961 he was Visiting special lecturer in Classics at the University of Toronto. From 1961 to 1962 he was assistant professor of classics at the University of Texas at Austin. From 1962 to 1971 he was professor of history at the McMaster University, Hamilton, Ontario, Canada.

From 1972 to 1995 he was professor of classics at the University of British Columbia in Vancouver and became professor emeritus.

From 1992 Elected Fellow of the Royal Society of Canada. From 1998 he was visiting faculty, Simon Fraser University, British Columbia. From 1997 he was visiting professor of history, University of Washington, Seattle. From 1998 to 1999 he was Whitehead Visiting Professor, American School of Classical Studies, Athens

Evans died in November 15, 2023, at the age of 92.

Blog of published work at Allan Evans at Sidney British Columbia

== Publications ==
- The Age of Justinian: the Circumstances of Imperial Power. London: Routledge, 1996.
- Herodotus: Explorer of the Past: Three Essays. Princeton: Princeton University Press, 1991.
- Polis and Imperium: Studies in honour of Edward Togo Salmon. Toronto: Hakkert, 1974.
- Procopius. New York: Twayne Publishers, 1972.
