= Areobindus (died 546) =

Roman general

- Died: 546; Carthage
- Occupations: Official, Military Commander
- Known for: Senator in Constantinople, Magister militum in Africa
- Title: Senator; Magister militum
- Spouse: Praejecta

Areobindus (Greek: Ἀρεόβινδος; died 546) was an official and military commander of the Eastern Roman (Byzantine) Empire. He served as a senator in Constantinople and briefly as magister militum in Africa in 545/6.

Areobindus was sent to Africa by Emperor Justinian I (r. 527–565) following the crisis which had erupted during Sergius's command. Areobindus's retinue included a contingent of Armenian troops led by Artabanes and John, descendants of the royal Armenian Arsacid line.

An inexperienced military commander, Areobindus proved unable to deal with the issue. After the Battle of Thacia, Justinian recalled Sergius and made Areobindus "overall commander" but the mutiny had already spread through the ranks.

In 546, Areobindus was killed in Carthage by the rebel Guntarith (Guntharis), the dux of Numidia. Areobindus was married to Praejecta.

== Sources ==
- Evans, J. A. S. (2001). The Age of Justinian: The Circumstances of Imperial Power. Routledge. ISBN 978-1134559763.
- Merrills, Andrew (2018). "Areobindus". In Nicholson, Oliver (ed.). The Oxford Dictionary of Late Antiquity. Oxford: Oxford University Press. ISBN 978-0-19-866277-8.
