= Praejecta =

Praejecta or Praiecta (Greek: Πραιέκτα) was sister to Byzantine emperor Justin II and a niece to Justinian I (r. 527–565).

== Biography ==
Praejecta was a daughter of Vigilantia and Dulcidio (or Dulcissimus), respectively the sister and brother-in-law of Emperor Justinian. She was also a sister of the later Byzantine emperor Justin II (r. 565–578) and the patricius Marcellus.

She was initially married to the patricius Areobindus, a senator of noble birth. In 545, as the situation in Africa had gotten out of control following the death of Solomon and his replacement by his incompetent nephew Sergius, Areobindus, although having no prior military experience, was dispatched there with a small force.

Areobindus was placed as joint commander with Sergius, but the two generals did not agree, with predictably disastrous results for the Byzantine imperial effort: the imperial forces were severely defeated at Thacia, although they managed to kill the rebel Stotzas. Following this, Sergius was relieved and Areobindus was installed in his stead. Soon, however, (March 546) he was murdered in a military mutiny led by Guntharic, the dux Numidiae. Praejecta and her sister-in-law had been sent to safety to a fortified monastery in Carthage, but when Guntharic took over the city, they were removed from there. Guntharic, who probably intended to marry Praejecta, kept her under house arrest but treated her well.

After Guntharic's assassination by the Armenian Artabanes in May and the restoration of Byzantine imperial rule, Praejecta rewarded him with a large sum of money and became engaged to him. Once she was back at Constantinople, Artabanes followed, but Empress Theodora discovered that he was already married and forbade the union. Artabanes was enraged by this affair, and it contributed to his involvement in the failed conspiracy to overthrow Emperor Justinian in late 548.

Praejecta was instead married off to John, son of Pompeius and grandson of Hypatius, a marriage which took place sometime in 546–548.
