= Guntarith =

Eastern Roman military officer

Guntarith (Vandalic: Gontharis; died 546), sometimes referred to as Guntharic, was an Eastern Roman military officer and rebel of Vandalic descent.

== Life ==
After the conquest of the Vandal Kingdom by Belisarius in 533/534, the Eastern Roman Empire was faced with numerous Moorish and Vandalic revolts. Only after the defeat of Stotzas's rebellion (545), would Guntarith, the dux of Numidia, play a leading role. With Moorish and Numidian support, he seized the province of Africa proconsularis and killed the imperial governor Areobindus in Carthage. The wife of Areobindus, Praejecta, niece of emperor Justinian I, was however spared. The goal of the rebels was probably the secession of the African provinces from the rule of Constantinople and the restoration of Vandal royal rule. When Guntarith began to consolidate his power with purges and mass executions, the strategos Artabanes, probably with the approval of the praetorian prefect Athanasius, organized the assassination of Guntarith. His Moorish supporter Stotzas the Younger was executed in Constantinople.

== Sources ==
- Gärtner, Thomas (2008). Untersuchungen zur Gestaltung und zum historischen Stoff der "Johannis" Coripps (in German). Berlin: De Gruyter. ISBN 978-3-11-020107-9.
- Martindale, John R.; Jones, A. H. M.; Morris, John, eds. (1971–1992). The Prosopography of the Later Roman Empire (3 vols.). Cambridge: Cambridge University Press. pp. 574–575.
- Rubin, Berthold (1995). Das Zeitalter Iustinians (in German). Vol. 2. Berlin: De Gruyter. pp. 47–49. ISBN 3-11-003411-5.
